= General Motors 54° V6 engine =

General Motors 54° V6
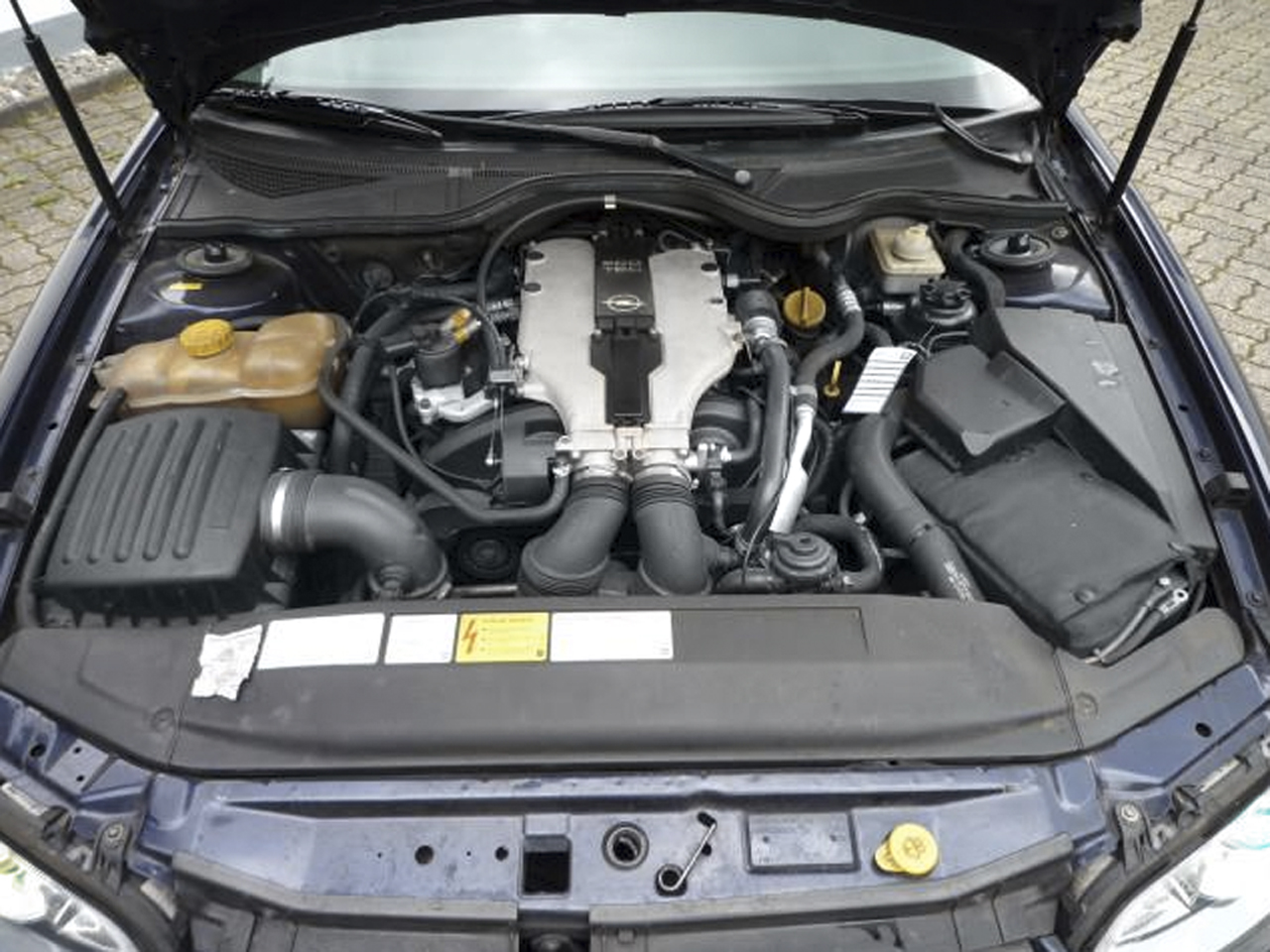

Overview
- Manufacturer: General Motors
- Also called: Ellesmere V6
- Production: 1994–2004

Layout
- Configuration: 54° V6
- Displacement: 2.5 L; 152.4 cu in (2,498 cc); 2.6 L; 158.5 cu in (2,597 cc); 3.0 L; 180.8 cu in (2,962 cc); 3.2 L; 193.8 cu in (3,175 cc)
- Cylinder bore: 81.6 mm (3.21 in); 83.2 mm (3.28 in); 86 mm (3.39 in); 87.5 mm (3.44 in)
- Piston stroke: 79.6 mm (3.13 in); 85 mm (3.35 in); 88 mm (3.46 in)
- Cylinder block material: Cast iron
- Cylinder head material: Aluminium
- Valvetrain: DOHC 4 valves × cyl.
- Compression ratio: 10.0:1, 10.8:1, 11.5:1

RPM range
- Idle speed: 450–1,030
- Max. engine speed: 6,600

Combustion
- Turbocharger: Garrett GT15 (in 1997–2003 Saab 9-5)
- Fuel system: Sequential multi-port fuel injection
- Management: Bosch Motronic 2.8; Saab Trionic T7
- Fuel type: Gasoline
- Oil system: Wet sump
- Cooling system: Water-cooled

Output
- Power output: 168–220 bhp (125–164 kW; 170–223 PS)
- Torque output: 227–310 N⋅m (167–229 lb⋅ft)

Emissions
- Emissions control systems: Secondary air injection, Exhaust gas recirculation

Chronology
- Predecessor: Opel CIH
- Successor: High Feature V6

General Motors' Opel subsidiary in Europe designed a compact V6 engine with an unusual 54° vee angle. It was an iron block/aluminum head DOHC design with four valves per cylinder. All 54° engines were assembled at Ellesmere Port in England.

== History ==
In the early 1990s, Opel identified the need for a modern, lightweight, and compact power plant to replace its aging straight-six engine range. These engines have a cast-iron engine block with cast aluminium alloy cylinder heads. The cylinder heads contain four valves per cylinder actuated by dual overhead camshafts which are driven by a timing belt. These engines, however, differed from many modern V6 engines in that it has a 54-degree cylinder bank angle as opposed to the more conventional 60-degree or 90-degree setup. This added to the engines' compactness which was needed to allow its use in front-wheel-drive applications, as well as rear-wheel-drive cars. Other features of these engines included an oil-to-water heat exchanger mounted within the V of the engine block, Bosch Motronic engine management system with full sequential fuel injection, knock control on each bank, Distributorless Ignition System (DIS), and closed-loop lambda sensor control.

Minor changes were made to the unit during its production, including an uprated oil pump around mid-1997, with the addition of larger oilways in the head machining (T-vents), and modified valve lifters to reduce top-end valve noise, at which point the cam belt arrangement also changed with the lower idler moving. Around 1998, the spin-on metal canister oil filter was changed to a disposable paper element.

== Revision ==
The engine was reworked substantially in 2000 in order to meet increasing emissions requirements, with the 2.5L and 3.0L being replaced by lower-compression 2.6L and 3.2L units. While displacement was changed the bore centers and deck height were retained. These later power plants had a revised engine management system setup, which used quad lambda sensor control, coil-per-plug ignition system and drive-by-wire throttles. As a result of these changes, the EGR and secondary air injection system were removed.

== Recalls ==
In its 3.0 L form, this engine was notable for recalls of all units installed in Cadillac Cateras due to timing belt tensioner bearing failures, which could cause catastrophic damage to the engine because of its interference design.

== 2.5 ==
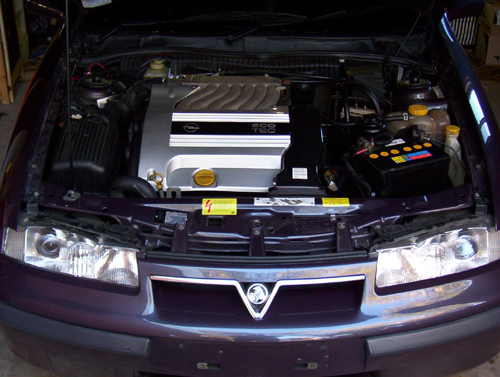
2.5 litre GM V6 engine in a Holden Calibra mounted transverse

The C25XE or B258I has an 81.6 mm × 79.6 mm (3.21 in × 3.13 in) bore and stroke which displaces 2.5 L; 152.4 cu in (2,498 cc). It produces a Deutsches Institut für Normung (DIN) rated output of 125 kW (170 PS; 168 bhp) @ 6,000 rpm, and generates 227 N⋅m (167 lb⋅ft) @ 3,200 rpm of torque. It was introduced in the Opel Vectra/Vauxhall Cavalier (both codenamed "Vectra-A") and Opel/Vauxhall Calibra. It features a Bosch Motronic 2.8.1 engine management system (Omega), with later examples featuring M2.8.3 (Calibra 1994, Vectra 1995) and a compression ratio of 10.8:1.

For 1994, in order to meet more stringent emissions requirements, a secondary air injection system and an EGR valve were added to the C25XE and it became the X25XE. The exception being the 1997 Calibras, which due to unavailability of C25XE engine blocks, were produced using the X25XE block but without modifications to the top end of the engine, and without addition of EGR. The X25XE also benefitted from a higher-volume oil pump. Firing order is 1-2-3-4-5-6.

The breakdown of the engine name is as follows:

- X – Exhaust emissions level: 94/12/EC, stage 2
- 25 – Displacement: 2.5 litres
- X – Compression ratio: 10.0–11.5:1
- E – Mixture system: Injection

Applications:

- Holden VS Commodore (export only)
- 1993–1997 Opel Calibra
- 1994–2000 Opel Omega B
- 1993–1995 Opel Vectra A
- 1995–2000 Opel Vectra B
- 1993–1998 Saab 900
- 1993–1995 Vauxhall Cavalier

=== MSD version ===
A special edition of the X25XE was worked by Motor Sports Developments (MSD); which includes reprofiled camshafts, giving the engine an increase of 24 bhp (18 kW; 24 PS). This engine appeared in two special edition Vauxhall Vectras: first the Vectra ST200 (not the normal SuperTouring), and then the Vectra 2.5 GSi V6.

Applications:

- Vauxhall Vectra ST200
- Vauxhall Vectra 2.5 GSi

== 3.0 ==
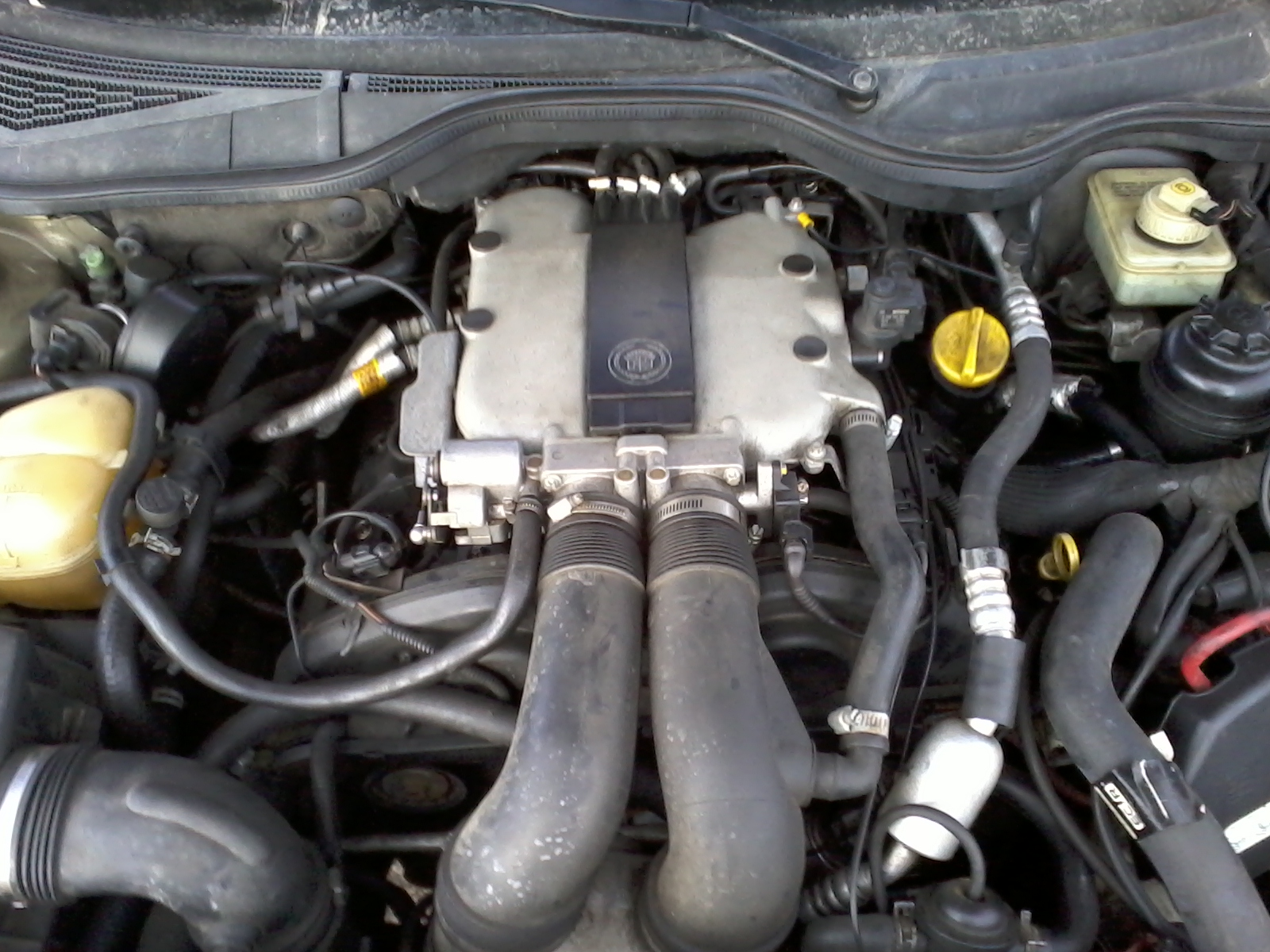
Cadillac Catera 3.0 litre V6 engine, longitudinally mounted

The X30XE, L81, B308I, or B308E has a 86 mm × 85 mm (3.39 in × 3.35 in) bore and stroke which displaces 3.0 L; 180.8 cu in (2,962 cc) with a compression ratio between 9.5:1 and 10.8:1. The naturally-aspirated version of the engine produces between 170 PS (168 hp; 125 kW), 177 PS (175 hp; 130 kW), and 210 PS (207 hp; 154 kW) @ 6,000 rpm with 184 lb⋅ft (249 N⋅m) to 199 lb⋅ft (270 N⋅m) @ 3,400 rpm. The B308E is a slightly modified X30XE used in the Saab 9-5. Engine management systems are Bosch Motronic M2.8.1, and later (approx. 2000) M2.8.3. Firing order is 1-2-3-4-5-6.

- X – Exhaust emissions level: 94/12/EC, stage 2
- 30 – Displacement: 3.0 litres
- X – Compression ratio: 10.0–11.5:1
- E – Mixture system: Injection

Applications:

- 1997–2001 Cadillac Catera
- 1996–2000 Opel Sintra
- 1994–2000 Opel Omega
- 1995–1997 Saab 9000
- 2000–2005 Saturn L-Series
- 2002–2003 Saturn Vue

=== B308E ===
For 1997, Saab introduced a turbocharged version called the B308E for its 9-5 model. The engine produced 200 hp (149 kW; 203 PS) at 5000 rpm and 229 lb⋅ft (310 N⋅m) of torque at 2500–4000 rpm. The engine was unique in that it used asymmetrical turbocharging, with the turbocharger driven by the exhaust gases from only one bank of cylinders. A charge pressure of 3.6 psi (0.25 bar) was produced using a Garrett GT15 turbo. The engine was equipped with a special version of Saab Direct Ignition and used the Trionic T7 engine management system. This turbocharged version of the engine weighs 195 kg (430 lb).

Applications:

- 1997–2003 Saab 9-5

== 2.6 ==
The Y26SE or LY9 engine has a displacement of 2.6 L; 158.5 cu in (2,597 cc) with a bore and stroke of 83.2 mm × 79.6 mm (3.28 in × 3.13 in), developing a maximum power output of 134 kW (180 hp) and 240 N⋅m (177 lb⋅ft) of torque with a 10.0:1 compression ratio.

Applications:

- Opel Omega B
- Opel Vectra B
- Cadillac CTS (Europe)

== 3.2 ==
The 3.2 L; 193.8 cu in (3,175 cc) LA3 or Y32SE is a complete redesign of the L81 for the Cadillac CTS and Opel Omega B. It had fixed (non-variable) valve timing, and a variable length intake manifold. The engine has a 87.5 mm × 88 mm (3.44 in × 3.46 in) bore and stroke with a 10.0:1 compression ratio. This engine produced 220 hp (164 kW; 223 PS) at 6000 rpm and 220 lb⋅ft (298 N⋅m) at 3400 rpm. Production started in July 2001, but the engine was replaced by the new GM High Feature engine starting in 2004.

Applications:

- 2003–2004 Cadillac CTS
- Opel Omega B
- Opel Vectra C
- Opel Signum

The Z32SE is a Y32SE modified for compliance with Euro 4 emissions standards. It has a 10.0:1 compression ratio and 155 kW (208 hp) and 310 N⋅m (229 lb⋅ft).

Applications:

- Opel Vectra C
- Opel Signum
