= Trionic T5.5 =

Engine management system

Trionic T5.5 is an engine management system in the Saab Trionic range. It controls ignition, fuel injection and turbo boost pressure. The system was introduced in the 1993 Saab 9000 2.3 Turbo with B234L and B234R engine.

== Changes ==
Since 1994 a number of changes have occurred.

- 1995. Four wire oxygen sensor, electronic heat plates in intake manifold (not in US and CA markets). K line is connected via VSS (Vehicle Security System) to enable immobilizing (certain markets). Vacuum pump for the vacuum servo assisted brake system with some control from Trionic is used on automobiles with automatic transmission.
- 1996. OBD II diagnostics on US and CA markets, which means two lambda probes.
- 1996, 5. Leakage diagnostics of the EVAP system on the OBD II variant.
- 1997. Heat plates are removed.
- 1998, 5. (Saab 9-3). K-line is connected via MIU (Main Instrument Unit) to enable immobilizing from TWICE (Theft Warning Integrated Central Electronics) (not in software for markets: US and CA). Fuel pump relay is electrically supplied from main relay. Request signal for Air Condition is feed from MIU. Electrical pre heating on oxygen sensor is supplied from main relay. Requested boost pressure is raised somewhat on automobiles with manual gearbox. SID message when leakage in EVAP-system is confirmed, applicable in On-Board Diagnostics II variants.
- 1998. Two new engine variants; B204R and B204E, B204E were available with manual gearbox only and demanded high octane gasoline to deliver the stated torque. B204E is lacking boost pressure control, this engine wasn’t available on US and CA markets. On the Swedish market automobiles is equipped with the B204E engine, OBD II diagnostics and ORVR (On board Refuelling Vapour Recovery system), a system that makes sure that the gasoline vapour doesn’t escape into the surrounding air during refuelling.

== Integrated circuits list ==
This table lists the IC's on the PCB.
Part number	Function	#	Usage	Datasheet
MC68332	Main MCU	1	All functions	
28F010	1Mb flash memory	2	Storage of the binary (program)	
TC55257	256Kb SRAM	1	Runtime memory	
L4937	Dual multifunction voltage regulator	1	Power supply	
AN82526	Can interface	1	Comunication	
TLC546	ADC (8-Bit, 20 channel, 40k SPS)	1	Sensor reading	
LM1815	Sensor amplifier	1	Crankshaft sensor amplifier	
L9842	Octal Power Driver			
74HC00	Quad positive NAND gate	2		
74HC02	Quad NOR gate	1		
74HC03	Quad NAND gate (open drain)	2		
74HC14	6 Hex inverting schmitt triggers	3		
74HC74	Dual D type flip-flop	1		
74HC123	Dual monostable multivibrator	1		
CA3262E	Quad 700 mA driver	1	DI triggering	
TLC274	Quad op-amp			
MTP3055V	N-channel MOSFET TO-220	3	BCV drivers (high current)	
MTD3055VL	N-channel MOSFET DPAK SMD	10	4 Injector drivers 2 EVAP purgue valve drivers 1 O2 sensor preheating 1 Vacuum pump driver 1 IAC valve driver	

== Description ==
Saab Trionic’s ignition system consists of an ignition cassette with four ignition coils, one for each spark plug. The ignition system is capacitive. The spark plugs are used as sensors to detect combustion and pre-ignition/pinging. This renders the camshaft position detector and knock sensor redundant. This function also enables the effective detection of misfires, which is an OBD II demand. The fuel injection is fully sequential and is dependent on the MAP (Manifold Absolute Pressure). Boost pressure control (L and R engines) utilises a solenoid valve pneumatically connected to the turbocharger’s waste gate.

The system was fitted on models Saab 900, Saab 9000 and Saab 9-3. This information is however most accurate for the SAAB 900.

== Fuel ==
=== Fuel injector valves ===
The fuel injector valves are of a solenoid type with a needle and seat. They are opened by a current flowing through the injector's coil and are closed by a strong spring when the current is switched off. To ensure as optimal combustion as possible and with that lower exhaust emission the injectors are equipped with four holes, which gives a good distribution of the fuel. The squirts of fuel are very exact positioned (two jets on the backside on each inlet valve). This put very high demands on the fixation of the injectors. To secure this fixation the injectors are fixed in pairs by a special retainer between cylinders 1 – 2 and 3 – 4. The injectors are electrically supplied from the main relay, while the ECU grounds the injectors.

=== Fuel injection ===
==== Pre-injection ====
When the ignition is switched on, the main relay and fuel pump relay are activated during a few seconds. As soon as the ECU gets the cranking signal (from the crankshaft sensor) it initiates a coolant temperature dependent fuel injection with all four injectors simultaneously which ensures a fast engine start. If the engine is started and shortly after is switched off a new pre-injection is initiated after the ignition has been switched off for 45 seconds.

==== Calculating of injection time ====
To decide how much fuel needs to be injected into each intake runner the ECU calculates the air mass that had been drawn into the cylinder. The calculation makes use of the cylinder volume (the B204 engine has a displacement of 0.5 litres per cylinder). That cylinder volume holds equal amount of air which has a density and thus a certain mass. The air density is calculated using the absolute pressure and temperature in the intake manifold. The air mass for combustion has now been calculated and that value is divided by 14.7 (stoichiometric relation for gasoline mass to air mass) to determine the required fuel mass for each combustion to inject. Since the flow capacity of the injector and the density of the fuel (pre programmed values) are known, the ECU can calculate the duration of the injection.

Using the oxygen sensor 1 the injection duration is corrected so stoichiometric combustion is obtained. When hard acceleration occurs, the lambda correction is masked and Wide Open Throttle (WOT) enrichment occurs for maximum performance. When opening the throttle, acceleration enrichment (accelerationsupprikning in Swedish) occurs and when closing the throttle deceleration emaciation (decelartionsavmagring in Swedish) occurs. During a cold start and warm up, before lambda correction is activated, coolant temperature dependable fuel enrichment occurs. With a warm engine and normal battery voltage the duration of injection varies between 2,5 ms at idle and approx. 18 – 20 ms at full torque.

==== Lambda correction ====
The catalyst requires that the fuel/air mixture is stoichiometric. This means that the mixture is neither rich nor lean, it is exactly 14,7 kg air to 1 kg gasoline (Lambda=1). That is why the system is equipped with an oxygen sensor in the forward part of the exhaust system. The sensor is connected to pin 23 in the ECU and is grounded in the ECU via pin 47. The exhaust fumes pass the oxygen sensor. The content of oxygen in the exhaust fumes is measured through a chemical reaction, this results in an output voltage. If the engine runs rich (Lambda lower than 1) the output voltage would be more than 0.45 V and if the engine runs lean (Lambda higher than 1) the output voltage would be less than 0.45 V. The output voltage swings about 0.45 V when Lambda passes 1. The ECU continuously corrects the injection duration so that Lambda=1 is always met. To be able to function the oxygen sensor needs to be hot, this requirement is met by electrically pre heat the sensor. The pre heating element is fed by B+ via fuse 38 and the main relay, the sensor is grounded in the ECU via pin 50. The ECU estimates the temperature on the exhaust gases (EGT) on the basis of the engine load and the engines RPM. At high EGT the electrical pre heating is disconnected. The lambda correction is masked during the engines first 640 revolutions after start if the coolant temperature exceeds 18°C (64°F) at load ranges over idle and under WOT or 32°C (90°F) at idle.

==== Adaptation ====
The ECU calculates the injection duration on basis of MAP and intake temperature. Injection duration are then corrected by multiplication of a correction factor, which is fetched from main fuel matrix (huvudbränslematrisen in Swedish) and is dependable on MAP and RPM. The need to correct the injection duration is due that the volumetric efficiency of the cylinder is dependent on the engines RPM. The last correction is made with the lambda correction, this results in a stoichiometric combustion (Lambda=1). The lambda correction is allowed to adjust the calculated injection duration by ±25%. The ECU can change the correction factors in the main fuel matrix on basis of the lambda correction, this ensures good driveability, fuel consumption and emissions when lambda correction isn’t activated. This is called Adaptation.

==== Pointed adaptation ====
If the ECU calculates the injection duration to 8 ms but the lambda correction adjusts it to 9 ms due low fuel pressure the ECU will "learn" the new injection duration. This is done by changing the correction factor for that particular RPM and load point in the main fuel matrix to a new correction factor resulting in 9 ms injection duration. The correction factor in this example will be raised by 9/8 (+12%). The pointed adaptation can change the points in the main fuel matrix by ±25%. Adaptation occurs every fifth minute and takes 30 seconds to finish, the criteria for the adaptation are: Lambda correction is activated and the coolant temperature is above 64°C (147F). During the adaptation the ventilation valve on the carbon canister is held close.

==== Global adaptation ====
The global adaptation on OBDII variants occurs during driving; on non OBDII variants the global adaptation occurs 15 minutes after engine shut down. When the engine is inside a defined load and RPM range (60 – 120 kPa and 2000 – 3000 RPM) no pointed adaptation will occur all points in the fuel matrix will be changed instead by a multiplication factor. Global adaptation can change the points in the main fuel matrix by ±25% (Tech2 shows ±100%). Adaptation occurs every fifth minute and takes 30 seconds to finish, the criteria for the adaptation are: Lambda correction is activated and the coolant temperature is above 64°C (147F). During the adaptation the ventilation valve on the carbon canister is held close.

==== Fuel cut ====
With fully closed throttle and engine RPM over 1900 RPM and with third, fourth and fifth gear a fuel cut will occur after a small delay (some second). On automobiles with automatic transmission fuel cut is active in all stages. The injectors are reactivated when the RPM hits 1400 RPM.

==== Fuel consumption measurement ====
The wire from the ECU to the third injector is also connected to the main instrument. The main instrument calculates the fuel consumption based on the injection pulses duration. The fuel consumption is used to help getting an accurate presentation of the fuel level in the fuel tank and to calculate average fuel consumption in SID.

== Turbo boost pressure ==
=== Basic charging pressure ===
Basic charging pressure is fundamental for Automatic Performance Control (APC). Basic charging pressure is mechanically adjusted on the actuators pushrod between the actuator and the waste gate. At to low basic charging pressure the engine doesn’t revs up as expected when the throttle is opened quickly. At to high basic charging pressure a negative adaptation occurs and maximum charging pressure cannot be achieved. In addition there is a substantial risk of engine damage since the charging pressure can’t be lowered enough when regulating with attention to pre ignition/pinging. Basic charging pressure shall be 0,40 ±0,03 bar (5,80 ±0,43 PSI). After adjustment the push rod must have at least two turns (2 mm) pre tension when connecting to the waste gate lever. The purpose with that is to make sure that the waste gate is held close when not affected. On new turbo chargers the basic charging pressure tends to be near or spot on the upper tolerance when the pre tension is two turns. The pre tension may never be lesser than two turns (2 mm). When checking the basic charging pressure it shall be noted that the pressure decreases at high RPM and increases at low outside temperatures.

=== Charging pressure regulation ===
Charging pressure regulation utilises a two coiled three way solenoid valve pneumatically connected with hoses to the turbo charger’s waste gate, the turbo chargers outlet and the compressor’s inlet. The solenoid valve is electrically supplied from +54 via fuse 13 and is controlled by the ECU via its pin 26 and pin 2. The control voltage is pulse width modulated (PWM) at 90 Hz below 2500 RPM and 70 Hz above 2500 RPM. The rationale for this change is to avoid resonance phenomena in the pneumatic hoses. By grounding pin2 longer than pin 26 the charging pressure is decreased and vice versa, when pin 26 is grounded longer than pin 2 the charging pressure is increased. To be able to regulate the charging pressure the ECU must at first calculate a requested pressure, a pressure value that the system must strive for. This is done by taking a pre programmed value (matrix of values established in respect of RPM and throttle opening). At WOT the pressure values for each RPM are selected to make sure that the engine gets the requested torque.

When one or both of the following criteria are met, a limitation of the charging pressure is set.

- In first, second and reverse gear there is an RPM dependable maximum value. The ECU calculates which gear that is in use by comparing the speed of the automobile and the engines RPM.
- When pre ignition/pinging occurs a maximum charge pressure is set on the basis of a mean value from each cylinders retarding of the ignition.

One or both of the following criteria initiates a lowering of the charging boost pressure to basic boost pressure.

- When the brake pedal is pressed down and pin 15 on the ECU is supplied with battery voltage.
- Certain fault codes is set (Faulty throttle position sensor (TPS), pressure sensor, pre ignition/pinging signal or charging pressure regulation) or low battery voltage.

=== Computing, adaptation ===
When the required charge pressure has finally been calculated it is converted to the PWM signal that controls the solenoid valve, The ECU then controls that the actual pressure (measured by the pressure sensor) corresponds with the required pressure. If needed the PWM is fine tuned by multiplication of a correction factor. The correction factor (adaptation) is then stored in the memory of the ECU and is always used in the calculation of the PWM signal. The rationale with this is to make sure that the actual pressure as soon as possible will be equal to the required after a change of the load has occurred.

== Ignition timing ==
=== Ignition cassette ===
The red ignition cassette used with Trionic 5 is mounted on the valve cover on top of the spark plugs. The ignition cassette houses four ignition coils/transformers whose secondary coil is direct connected to the spark plugs. The cassette is electrically supplied with battery voltage from the main relay (B+) and is grounded in an earth point. When the main relay is activated the battery voltage is reformed to 400 V DC which is stored in a capacitor. 400 V voltage is connected to one of the poles of the primary coil in the four spark coils. To the ignition cassette there are four triggering lines connected from the Trionic ECU, pin 9 (cyl. 1), pin 10 (cyl. 2), pin 11 (cyl. 3) and pin 12 (cyl. 4). When the ECU is grounding pin 9, the primary coil for the first cylinder is grounded (via the ignition cassettes B+ intake) and 400 V is transformed up to a maximum of 40 kV in the secondary coil for cyl. 1. The same procedure is used for controlling the ignition timing of the rest of the cylinders.

=== Ignition regulation ===
At start the ignition point is 10° BTDC. To facilitate start when coolant temperature is below 0°C the ECU will ground each trigger line 210 times/second between 10° BTDC and 20° ATDC, at which a “multi spark” will appear. The function is active up to an engine speed of 900 RPM. At idle a special ignition matrix is utilised. Normal ignition point is 6°-8° BTDC. If the engine stalls e.g. cooling fan activation the ignition point is advanced up to 20 ° BTDC in order to increase the engines torque to restore the idle RPM. In the same way the ignition is retarded if the engines RPM is increased. When the TPS senses an increase in throttle opening the ECU leaves the idle ignition timing map and regulates the ignition timing in respect of load and engine speed.

During engine operations the Ignition cassette continuously monitors the ion currents in the cylinders and sends a signal to the Trionic ECU, pin 44, in an event of knocking. The logic for this function rests solely in the ignition cassette and is adaptive to be able to handle disturbing fuel additives. The Trionic ECU is well aware which cylinder that has ignited and could hence cope with the information feed through one pin. The signal to pin 44 and ion current in the combustion chamber is related to each other, when this signal reaches a certain level the ECU interprets this as a knocking event and firstly lowering the ignition advance by 1,5° on this cylinder. If the knocking is repeated the ignition advance is lowered further 1,5 ° up to 12°. In case of the same lowering of the ignition timing advance in all cylinders the ECU adds a small amount of fuel to all cylinders. If knocking occurs when the MAP is over 140 kPa the knocking is regulated by switching both fuel injection matrix and ignition advance matrix. If this is not sufficient the charging pressure is lowered. This purpose of this procedure is to maintain good performance. If the signal between the ignition cassette and the ECU is lost, the charging pressure is lowered to basic charging pressure and the ignition timing advance is lowered 12° when it exist a risk of knocking due to engine load.

=== Combustion signals ===
The Trionic system lacks a camshaft position sensor. This sensor is normally a prerequisite for a sequential pre ignition/pinging regulation and fuel injection. Saab Trionic must decide whether cylinder one or cylinder four ignites when the crank shaft position sensor indicates that cylinder one and four is at TDC. This is done by help of ionization current. One of the poles of the secondary coil of the spark coils is connected to the spark plugs in an ordinary manner. The other pole isn’t grounded directly but connected to an 80 V voltage. This means that an 80 V voltage is applied across the spark gap of the spark plugs, except when the spark is fired. When combustion has occurred the temperature in the combustion chamber is very high. The gases are formed as ions and start to conduct electric current. This results in a current flowing in the spark plug gap (without resulting in a spark). The ionisation current is measured in pairs, cylinder one and two is one pair and cylinder three and four in the other pair. If combustion occurs in cylinder one or two the ignition cassette sends battery voltage (B+) pulse to the ECU, pin 17. If the combustion takes place in cylinder three or four the B+ pulse is fed to pin 18 in ECU. If the crankshaft position sensor indicates that cylinders one and four are at TDC and a B+ pulse enters the ECU via pin 17 simultaneously, then the ECU know that it is cylinder one that has ignited. Upon starting, the ECU doesn’t know which cylinder is in compression phase, hence ignition is initiated in both cylinders one and four and 180 crank shaft degrees later sparks in cylinder two and three are fired. As soon as the combustion signals enters the ECU via pin 17 and pin 18 the ignition and fuel injection is synchronised to the engines firing order. The combustion signals are also used to detect misfires.

== Heat plates ==
Heat plates are used to lower the warm up emissions. They vaporize the injected fuel before it is drawn/forced into the cylinders and consequently reduce the need for added fuel in the A/F mixture in the warm up phase thus reducing the emissions. At engine start and coolant temperature lower than +85°C Pin 29 on ECU is grounded and a relay in the engine compartment are activated and closes the electrical circuit for the Heat Plates. The circuit is protected by a 40 A MAXI fuse. When the coolant temperature is warmer than +85°C or four minutes has passed the Heat Plates are switched off.

To compensate for the increased air resistance in the intake, engines fitted with Heat Plates have a slightly adjusted charge pressure, Approximately: +0.2 bar, this means that LPT models with heat plates have a solenoid valve to raise the charging pressure above basic charging pressure.

In case of a Heat Plate-failure the car may have drivability problems due condensed fuel in the intake during cold engine operations. This condensed fuel is compensated in engines without Heat Plates by enriching the A/F mixture.

The heat plates are activated by software, which enables different algorithms to use the plates and to compensate for the intake restriction caused by the plates' presence.

== Other features ==
=== Shift Up lamp ===
The Shift Up lamp can be found on OBD II cars. The lamp helps the driver to drive economically. The lamp is supplied by ignition power (+15) and is grounded in the Trionic ECU, pin 55. The Shift Up Lamp is lit when the ignition is turned on for three seconds to test the circuit. During normal driving the lamp is lit when reaching a specific RPM while driving at light loads. At wide-open-throttle the Shift Up lamp is lit when the RPM is near 6000 RPM. The lamp does not light in fifth gear. The light is lit at a higher RPM when the engine is cold to promote a quicker warm up.

== See also ==
- Trionic T5.2
- Trionic 8
