= Saab Direct Ignition =

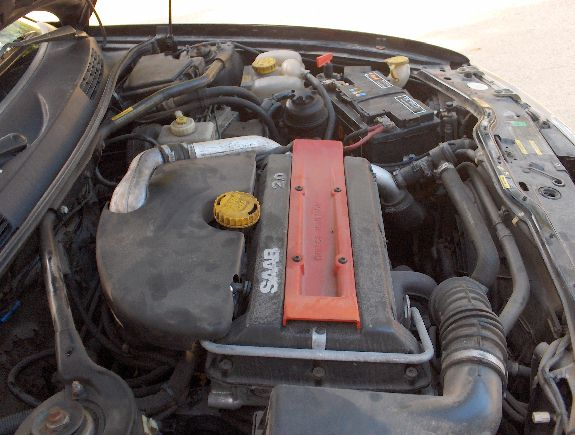
B204L engine with red DI module in a 1995 Saab 900 NG.

Saab Direct Ignition is a capacitor discharge ignition developed by Saab Automobile, then known as Saab-Scania, and Mecel AB during the 1980s.

It was first shown in 1985 and put into series production in the Saab 9000 in 1988. One of the first instances of using the system was for a Formula Three racing engine (on B202 basis) developed with the help of engine builder John Nicholson, first shown in the spring of 1985. The system has been revised several times over the years. The ignition system together with the ignition coils form a single transformer oil filled cassette (or two cassettes in the case of a V6 engine) which is placed directly on the spark plugs, without the need for a distributor.

It was later implemented with the Saab Trionic Engine Management Systems as one of the first ion sensing ignition system on a production car. The system puts a low voltage over the spark plugs when they are not fired to measure ionization in the cylinders. The ionic current measurement is used to replace the ordinary knock sensor and misfire measurement function.

== Direct Ignition Cassette ==
The spark plugs are directly coupled to the "DIC" (or "IDM") which houses the ignition coils and electronics that measure cylinder ionization for use by the Trionic engine management system.

== See also ==
- Direct & Distributorless Ignition
- Saab H engine
- Saab 900NG (2nd Generation 900, 1994-1998)
- Saab 9-3 (1st Generation, 1999-2002)
