= T52 =

T52 may refer to:

- T52 (classification), a disability sport classification
- Cooper T52, a British racing car
- Diamond T-52, an Austrian military trainer aircraft
- Siemens and Halske T52, a German cipher machine and teleprinter
- Slingsby T.52, a British glider design
- T-52 Enryu, a Japanese rescue robot
- Trionic T5.2, an automobile engine management system
