= Mecel =

Swedish automotive consulting firm

Mecel AB
- Company type: AB
- Industry: Automotive Software and System
- Founded: September 1982
- Headquarters: Gothenburg, Sweden
- Revenue: 12 million EUR (2010)
- Number of employees: 120 (2011)
- Website: www.mecel.se

Mecel is a software and systems consulting firm, specializing in the automotive industry. The company has offices in Gothenburg and has approximately 120 employees.

== History ==
Mecel was founded in Sweden in 1982 by Jan Nytomt and Hasse Johansson, who later became technical manager at Scania. The company idea was to provide the automotive industry with electronic engine control devices. In 1982, Saab-Scania Combitech Group, as the company was named at the time, acquired Mecel. When General Motors bought the Saab-Scania car operations in 1990, Mecel followed with it. In 1997, General Motors created the company Delphi Automotive Systems and subsequently Mecel became a wholly owned subsidiary of Delphi. Mecel has since been operating as an independent software and system house being able to offer services to all customers.

In 1987, a software division, Mecel Gothenburg, was started in Chalmers University Science Park with the intention of investigating and developing multiplexed signaling in the vehicle based on CAN. In 1990, Mecel and Mecel Gothenburg together formed Mecel AB and Mecel Gothenburg has since 2000, has been organizational headquarters.

In 2006, the Åmål office was purchased by co founder Jan Nytomt and in 2007, the Mecel Engine Systems was acquired by Hoerbiger.

In 2009, Mecel had an operating revenue of 107.3 million. In 2010, the company had sales of SEK 110.1 million. President from 2000 until 2011, was Kent-Eric Lång, succeeded by Henrik Häggström in August 2011.

In 2017, the company was dissolved after merging with Delphi Automotive Systems Sweden Aktiebolag.

== Company Operations ==
Some major contributions to the industry during the years:

- The IonSense technology was developed by the Mecel founders in the 80's and are presented in a number of patents. US patents 4785789, 4903676, 4947810, 5769049, 5992386, 6123057, 6827061. The technology are used in a number of applications among others Saab Direct Ignition where it was introduced in the Trionic T5.2 system.
- In the European Union research programme FP4 was Mecel a member and contributor of the X-by-wire project
- Mecel has also been contributing to the automotive standardization two examples are within ISO.
  - ISO 14229 where Anders Lundqvist was (chairman).
  - ISO 26262 where Håkan Sivencrona has been editor for subsection 10.

== Products ==
Some of Mecels product areas are:

- Automotive Bluetooth
- Picea
- Populus
