= Trionic T5.2 =

Engine management system

The Trionic T5.2, an advanced engine management system in the Trionic series, was introduced in Saab 9000 year 1993 and was discontinued the same year. This engine management system was used on the "long block" engines. It was superseded by the Trionic T5.5 engine management system.

== Features ==
Its Engine Control Unit is based on a Motorola 32 bit CPU.

The Trionic T5.2 uses a Mecel patented ion-current measurement^{1} to decide which cylinder was in the compression phase and had just ignited the air/fuel mixture. The ion-current measurement is thus used to synchronise the ignition's firing of the spark plug with the cylinder which is full of compressed air/fuel. This ion-current measurement can also determine whether there had been detonation or knocking when the cylinder fired. Finally, the ion-current measurement can be used to identify a misfire with outstanding accuracy.

Trionic T5.2 uses a MAP (Manifold Absolute Pressure) sensor to, indirectly, measure the weight of the air that has been drawn/forced into the cylinders. It uses a simple slotted aperture disc in conjunction with a crank position sensor to identify the Top Dead Center (TDC) for cylinders 1 & 4 and also to measure the engine's RPM.
