= Automatic Performance Control =

Automatic Performance Control (APC) was the first engine knock and boost control system. The APC was invented by Per Gillbrand at the Swedish car maker SAAB. U.S. patent 4,372,119

SAAB introduced it on the turbo charged Saab H engines in 1982, and the APC was fitted to all subsequent 900 Turbos through 1993 (and 1994 convertibles), as well as 9000 Turbos through 1989. The APC was sold to Maserati to equip the carbureted Maserati Biturbo, with different settings for the Biturbo, and was known as the Maserati Automatic Boost Controller (MABC).

1. knock sensor; 2. pressure transducer; 3. control unit; 4. solenoid valve

The APC allowed a higher compression ratio (initially, 8.5:1 as opposed to 7.2:1, and, on 16-valve variants introduced in 1985, 9.0:1). This improved fuel economy and allowed the use of low-octane petrol without causing engine damage caused by knock.

The APC controls boost pressure and the overall performance, specifically the rate of rise and maximum boost level - and it detects and manages harmful knock events.

To control the turbocharger, the APC monitors the engine's RPM and inlet manifold pressure via a pressure transducer, and uses these inputs to control a solenoid valve that trims the rate of rise of pressure as well as the maximum pressure by directing boost pressure to the turbocharger's pneumatic wastegate actuator.

To detect knock, a piezoelectric knock sensor (basically a microphone) bolted to the engine block responds to unique frequencies caused by engine knock. The sensor generates a small voltage that is sent to the electronic control unit, which processes the signal to determine if, in fact, knock is occurring. If it is, then the control unit activates a solenoid valve that directs boost pressure to the turbocharger's pneumatically controlled wastegate, that opens to bypass exhaust gases from the turbocharger directly to the exhaust pipe, lowering turbo boost pressure until the knock subsides. Knock events that are managed by the APC can be discerned when the in-dash boost needle "twitches" slightly. The APC unit has a 'knock' output where an LED may be connected. This LED will then light up if knock is detected. Because the knock sensor becomes less accurate at high revolutions, the APC tapers maximum boost pressure after approximately 4,500 RPM.

== APC boost gauge ==
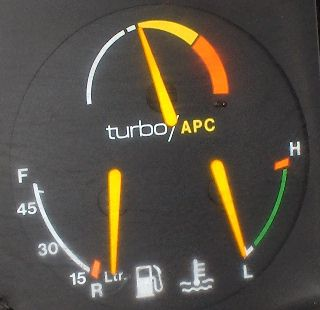
turbo/APC boost gauge in a Saab 900

Saab Full Pressure Turbo (FPT) models with this unit include the APC name displayed on a non-numeric boost pressure gauge in the instrument panel. Although knock sensors are common even on non-turbocharged and turbocharged engines today, Saab has continued to use the APC name prominently as a differentiating feature.

The white area on the left side of the scale shows manifold vacuum under normal driving conditions, the short white dash is atmospheric pressure (engine off), the orange scale is where there is safe turbo boost, the red scale is boost above 0.5 - 0.7 bar where the wastegate may be opened or a fuel cut due to overboost may occur.

Saab integrated the APC's boost control functionality with ignition control in 1990 with the introduction of the DI/APC system, available in 9000 models only. The DI/APC system managed knock not only by decreasing boost via a solenoid but by retarding ignition timing as well; DI/APC also managed the engine's basic ignition timing.

== See also ==
- Saab Information Display
- Trionic
