= Saab H engine =

Automobile engine; redesign of the Saab B

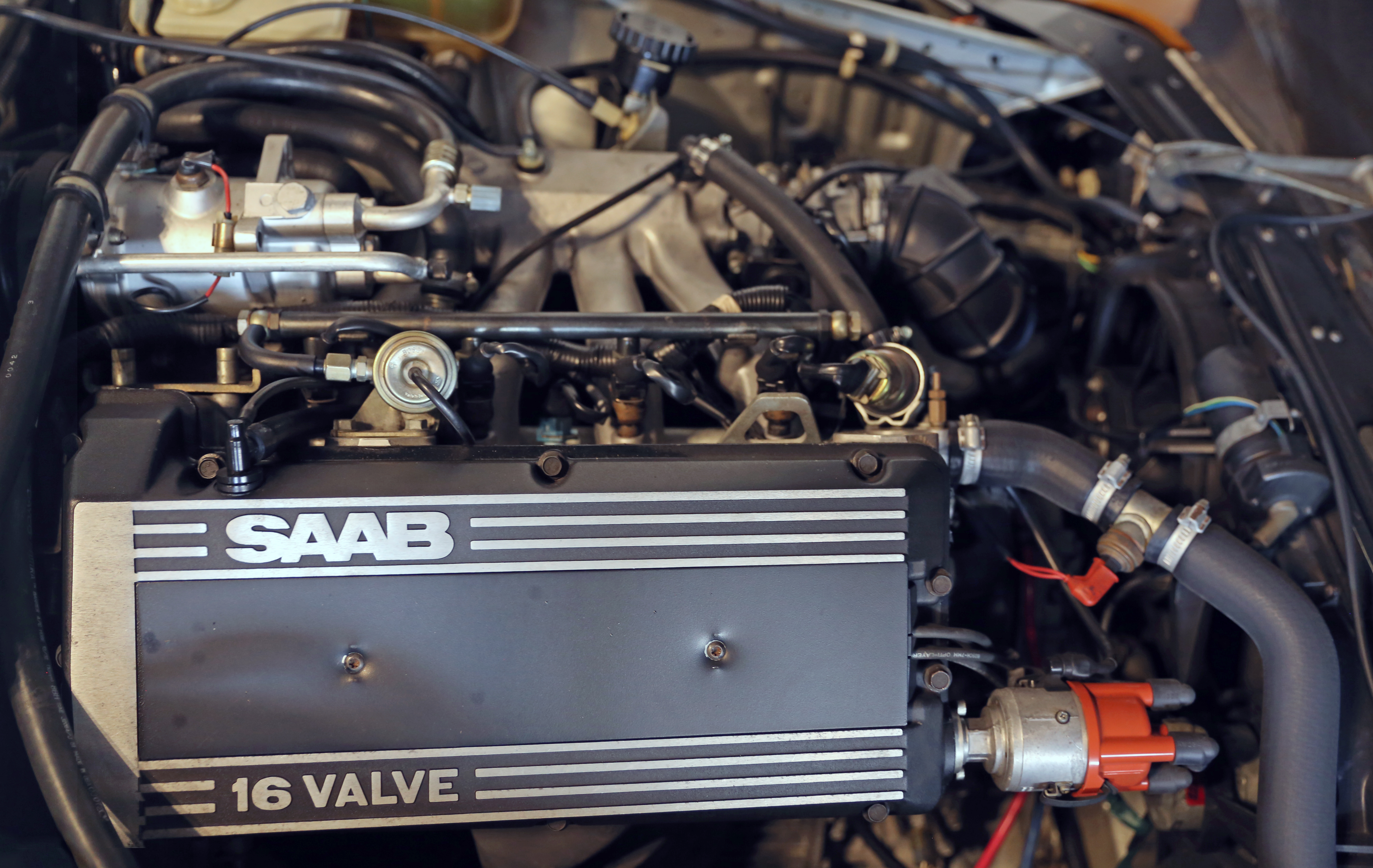
- Naturally aspirated B202 16 valve engine in a 1986 Saab 900

Overview
- Manufacturer: Saab Automobile (1981-2010); BAIC (2009-present)
- Also called: Ecopower; Family III engine
- Production: 1981–2010

Layout
- Configuration: Inline-4
- Displacement: 1,799 cc (109.8 cu in); 1,985 cc (121.1 cu in); 2,119 cc (129.3 cu in); 2,290 cc (140 cu in)
- Cylinder bore: 85.7 mm (3.37 in); 90 mm (3.54 in); 93 mm (3.66 in)
- Piston stroke: 78 mm (3.07 in); 90 mm (3.54 in)
- Cylinder block material: Cast iron
- Cylinder head material: Aluminum
- Valvetrain: SOHC 2 valves x cyl.; DOHC 4 valves x cyl.
- Compression ratio: 8.8:1; 9.2:1; 9.25:1; 10.0:1; 10.1:1; 10.5:1

Combustion
- Turbocharger: Garrett T25; Garrett GT1752S; MHI TD04HL-15G-6 (in some versions)
- Fuel system: Carburetor, Fuel injection
- Management: Bosch K-Jetronic; Bosch LH-Jetronic; Lucas CU14; Saab Trionic
- Fuel type: Gasoline
- Oil system: Wet sump
- Cooling system: Water-cooled

Output
- Power output: 92–310 hp (69–231 kW; 93–314 PS)
- Torque output: 177–440 N⋅m (131–325 lb⋅ft)

Emissions
- Emissions target standard: Euro 6 (BAIC)
- Emissions control systems: Catalytic converter, EGR

Chronology
- Predecessor: Saab B engine
- Successor: GM Ecotec engine

The Saab H engine is a redesign of the Saab B engine, which in turn was based on the Triumph Slant-4 engine.

Despite the name it is not an H engine or horizontally opposed engine, but a slanted inline-4. The H engine was introduced in 1981 in the Saab 900 and was also used in the Saab 99 from 1982 onwards. H stood for high compression; higher compression was part of the update from B to H engine. It continued in use in the 900/9-3, 9000, and 9-5. The 2003 GM Epsilon-based 9-3 switched to the GM Ecotec engine, leaving the 9-5 as the sole user of the H engine. The H family of engine was used in the first-generation 9-5 until it was discontinued in 2010. The tooling and know-how was sold to BAIC. The latter B2X4 and B2X5 engines have in practice nothing in common with the early B engines except cylinder spacing.

All versions feature a grey cast iron block and an aluminum head with a single or double overhead chain driven camshafts. SOHC engines use two valves per cylinder and DOHC versions use four valves per cylinder with a pentroof chamber, the valve angle being 22 degrees from vertical. All engines use flat inverted bucket type valve lifters, hydraulic in the case of DOHC engines.

The engines were given numbers, for instance B201 is a 2.0-litre (20) engine with one camshaft.

== B201 ==
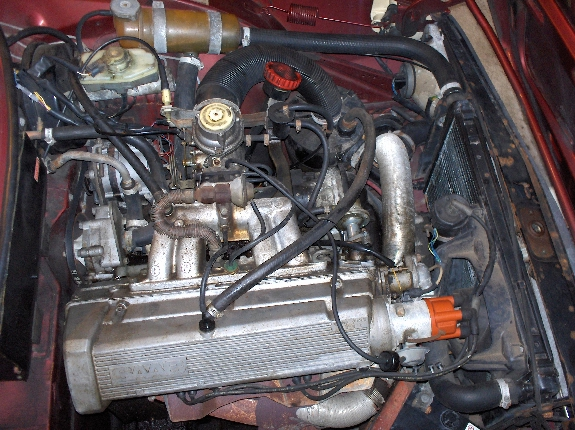
Saab H engine (B201) in a 1987 Saab 90

B201 is the original H engine with two valves per cylinder and a single overhead camshaft. It was introduced in 1981 and unlike the B engine it did not have the central shaft which used to power the distributor, oil- and coolant pump. Instead the distributor is located at the front of the cylinder head and directly driven by the camshaft, while the integrated waterpump was replaced with a separate unit to the rear of the engine.

It was available with 100 PS (74 kW; 99 hp) at 5200 rpm using a single carburettor, 108 PS (79 kW; 107 hp) at 5200 rpm using a dual carburettor, 118 PS (87 kW; 116 hp) at 5500 rpm using Bosch K-Jetronic fuel injection and a turbocharged, fuel injected version with 145 PS (107 kW; 143 hp) at 5000 rpm. In 1986 an intercooled version of the turbo engine also became available, it produces 155 PS (114 kW; 153 hp) at 5500 rpm.

Valmet Automotive in Uusikaupunki also planned a downsized 1.6 liter version of B201, to better suit Finnish vehicle tax laws. Downsizing was made by using a narrower cylinder bore. The prototype engine produced 92 PS (68 kW; 91 hp) at 5400 rpm, fitted with Bosch K-Jetronic fuel injection. One such prototype engine is displayed in the Uusikaupunki Saab museum.

== B202 and B212 ==
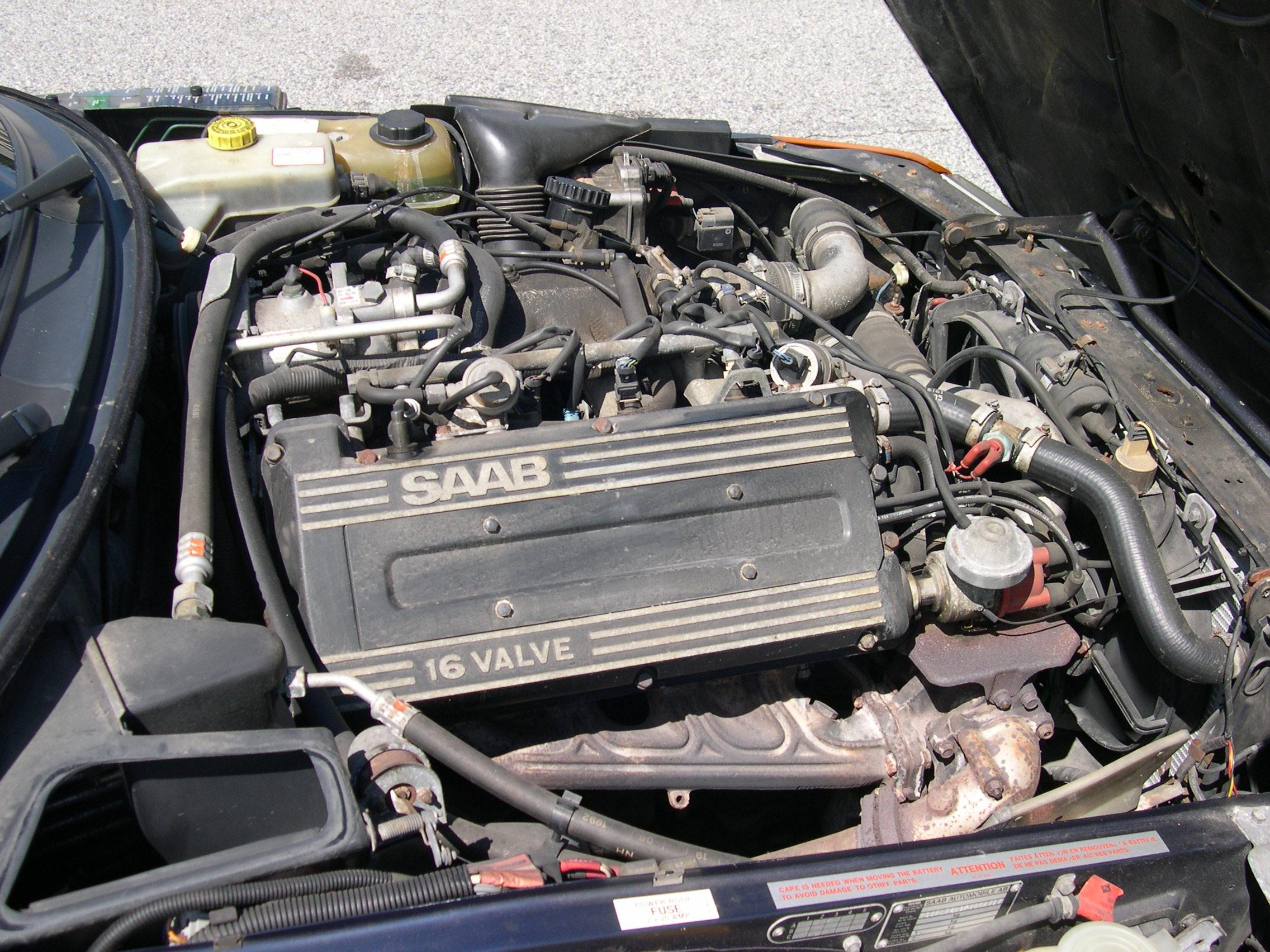
Saab B202 turbo 16-valve engine in a 1993 Saab 900T

In 1984, Saab added a 16 valve cylinder head with double overhead camshafts. They retroactively renamed the 8-valve version the B201 and used B202 as the name of the new multi-valve unit. Another notable addition to the B202 was hydraulic valve lifters and Ecopower ("ep" in Italy, "(900)S" elsewhere), with a pre-heated catalytic converter for reduced emissions.

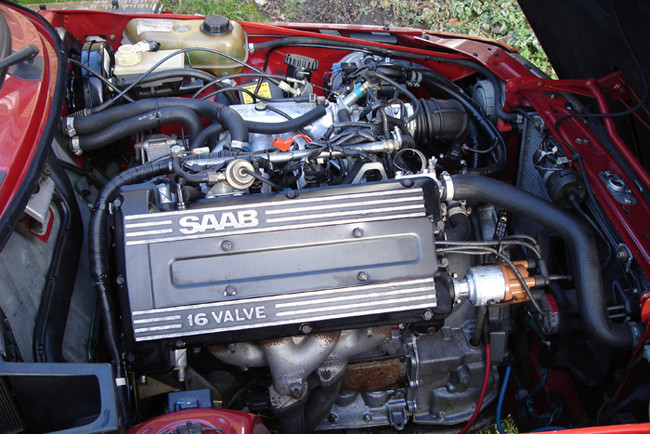
1991 Saab B212 engine. It is longitudinally mounted in a SAAB 900.

In 1991, Saab introduced a 140 hp (103 kW) naturally aspirated 16 valve version of this engine with displacement increased to 2.1 L (2,119 cc; 129.3 cu in) and a new name of B212. The inlet manifold was enlarged and redesigned for improved flow. The intake manifold and the head from the 2.1-litre constitute a well-known replacement for 1985-1993 16 valve, 2.0-litre turbocharged Saabs. Power increase is modest at stock boost but becomes much more evident at higher boost levels.

Engine builder John Nicholson also developed a Formula Three engine from the B202, for use in a Reynard 853 chassis. This engine is one of the first to use Saab's direct ignition system (SDI) and produced 165 PS (121 kW) at 5600 rpm. Its other strength was high power in an unusually broad powerband for a naturally aspirated racing engine.

== B204 and B234 ==
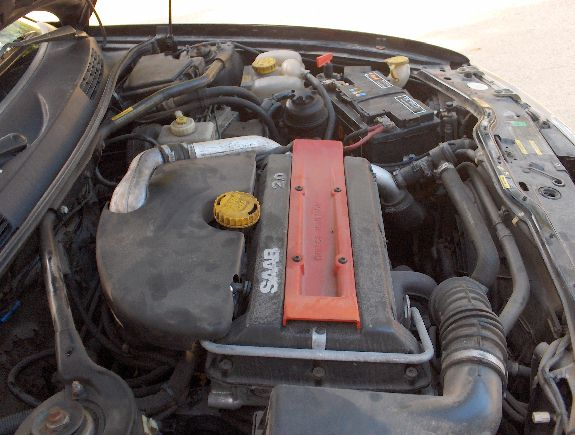
Saab B204L engine in a 1995 Saab 900 (NG) SE convertible. Note the red Saab Direct Ignition module, which was common to B204 and B234 engines with Trionic 5 engine management system. Only naturally aspirated NG900 and OG9-3 versions had Motronic engine management system with distributor ignition.

A major redesign of the H engine came in 1990 in the form of the new B234 for the Saab 9000. The B234 featured an increase in stroke from 78 mm (3.07 in) to 90 mm (3.54 in), increasing the displacement to 2.3 liters. With this increased stroke also came a new engine block with increased deck height to make sufficient room for the increased stroke length without being forced to use shorter connecting rods, and in-block counter-rotating balance shafts for reduced vibration (NVH). There are two generations of B234 engine, one made from 1990-1993, the other from 1994 to 1998. The later motors had a revised oil sump system, head, timing cover, and different bell housing pattern. Unlike the previous B202, the block was no longer angled, but straight, something that made it unsuitable for the 900 model with its gearbox under the engine, built into the engine oil sump. The longer stroke B234 was last produced in 1998, that being the last year for the 9000 model. The B234 was selected as one of Ward's 10 Best Engines for 1995 and 1996.

The B202 was still being produced in 1993, but for the new generation Saab 900 being released in 1994 a new 2.0L engine was required. This new engine, the B204, was based on the 9000's B234, but in order to make the engine fit in the 900 the engine had to be shortened. This meant that a new chain drive for the camshafts was required to reduce the length of the engine. The B204 engine was available with natural aspiration in 900, 9000 and 9-3 in the form of 2.0i (B204i), with a low pressure turbo in the form of 9000 and 9-3 2.0t (B204E) or Saab 900 and 9-3 2.0T (B204L). B204R was briefly available in the 1999 9-3 Aero (U.S. market 'SE') model. B204 was in production in the Saab 9-3 until 2000, when it was replaced by B205.

With the introduction of the OBDII compliant B204 (also coincidental with the introduction of Trionic T5.5) Saab embarked on a new concept they termed as "Ecopower" where engines were designed for high power output while also delivering exceptional economy and low environmental impact.

Turbocharged engines used Garrett T25 turbochargers and the B234R (9000 Aero manual) used a Mitsubishi Heavy Industries TD04HL-15G-6 in model year -93 and TD04HL-15T-6 later on.

The B204 and B234 are regarded by engine tuners as the preferable engine for performance tuning over the later B205 and B235 engines as the internals are of a higher strength. The later models had lightened internal components to improve efficiency and fuel economy but limit the total power output when the engine's software is revised to increase the boost pressures and specific power output. The B204 engine became a very popular engine swap for Vauxhall and Opel Astra, Calibra, Cavalier and Vectras with the GM T-body platform, in Scandinavia in the mid 2000s—the engine uses the same mounting positions due to sharing the same platform. In the UK it is swapped into rotary equipped Mazda RX8, in Ukraine and Russia it is a swap option for Daewoo (now Chevrolet) models of similar age.

Specifications
Engine	Power	Torque	CR.	Bore × Stroke	Rod Length	Boost pressure
B204i	130 hp (96 kW) at 5500 rpm	177 N⋅m (131 lb⋅ft) at 4300 rpm	10.1:1	90 mm × 78 mm (3.54 in × 3.07 in)	153 mm (6.0 in)	—N/a
B204E	154 hp (113 kW) at 5500 rpm	219 N⋅m (162 lb⋅ft) at 3600 rpm	9.2:1	90 mm × 78 mm (3.54 in × 3.07 in)	153 mm (6.0 in)	0.4 bar (5.8 psi)
B204L	185 hp (136 kW) at 5500 rpm	263 N⋅m (194 lb⋅ft) at 2100 rpm	9.2:1	90 mm × 78 mm (3.54 in × 3.07 in)	153 mm (6.0 in)	0.73 bar (10.6 psi)
B204R	205 hp (151 kW) at 5500 rpm	283 N⋅m (209 lb⋅ft) at 2200 rpm	9.2:1	90 mm × 78 mm (3.54 in × 3.07 in)	153 mm (6.0 in)	1 bar (15 psi)
B234i (1990–1993)	146 hp (107 kW) at 5500 rpm	212 N⋅m (156 lb⋅ft) at 3800 rpm	10.1:1	90 mm × 90 mm (3.54 in × 3.54 in)	147 mm (5.8 in)	—N/a
B234i (1994–)	150 hp (110 kW) at 5600 rpm	210 N⋅m (155 lb⋅ft) at 4300 rpm	10.5:1	90 mm × 90 mm (3.54 in × 3.54 in)	153 mm (6.0 in)	—N/a
B234E	170 hp (125 kW) at 5700 rpm	260 N⋅m (192 lb⋅ft) at 2100 rpm	9.25:1	90 mm × 90 mm (3.54 in × 3.54 in)	147 mm (5.8 in)	0.55 bar (8.0 psi)
B234L (1990–1993)	195 hp (143 kW) at 5500 rpm	329 N⋅m (243 lb⋅ft) at 1900 rpm (5MT)	8.5:1	90 mm × 90 mm (3.54 in × 3.54 in)	147 mm (5.8 in)	0.8 bar (12 psi)
B234L (1994–1998)	200 hp (147 kW) at 5500 rpm	323 N⋅m (238 lb⋅ft) at 1800 rpm (5MT)	9.25:1	90 mm × 90 mm (3.54 in × 3.54 in)	147 mm (5.8 in)	0.8 bar (12 psi)
B234R	225 hp (165 kW) at 5500 rpm	342 N⋅m (252 lb⋅ft) at 1950 rpm	9.25:1	90 mm × 90 mm (3.54 in × 3.54 in)	147 mm (5.8 in)	1.08 bar (15.7 psi)

Note: The primary difference between the B204L and the B204R is with the intercooler, the turbo, the wastegate 'base boost' setting.

== B206 ==
The B206 is a version of the B204 but without the dual balance shafts and without oil jets under the pistons. It was only offered as a naturally aspirated engine B206I producing 133 hp (99 kW), seemingly a Europe-and-Australia-only option in 1994 non-turbo 900 NGs. This engine is popular among Saab tuners in Sweden (e.g. Trollspeed) due to the lack of balance shafts but with presumably equal strength as the turbo blocks with balance shafts.

== B205 and B235 ==
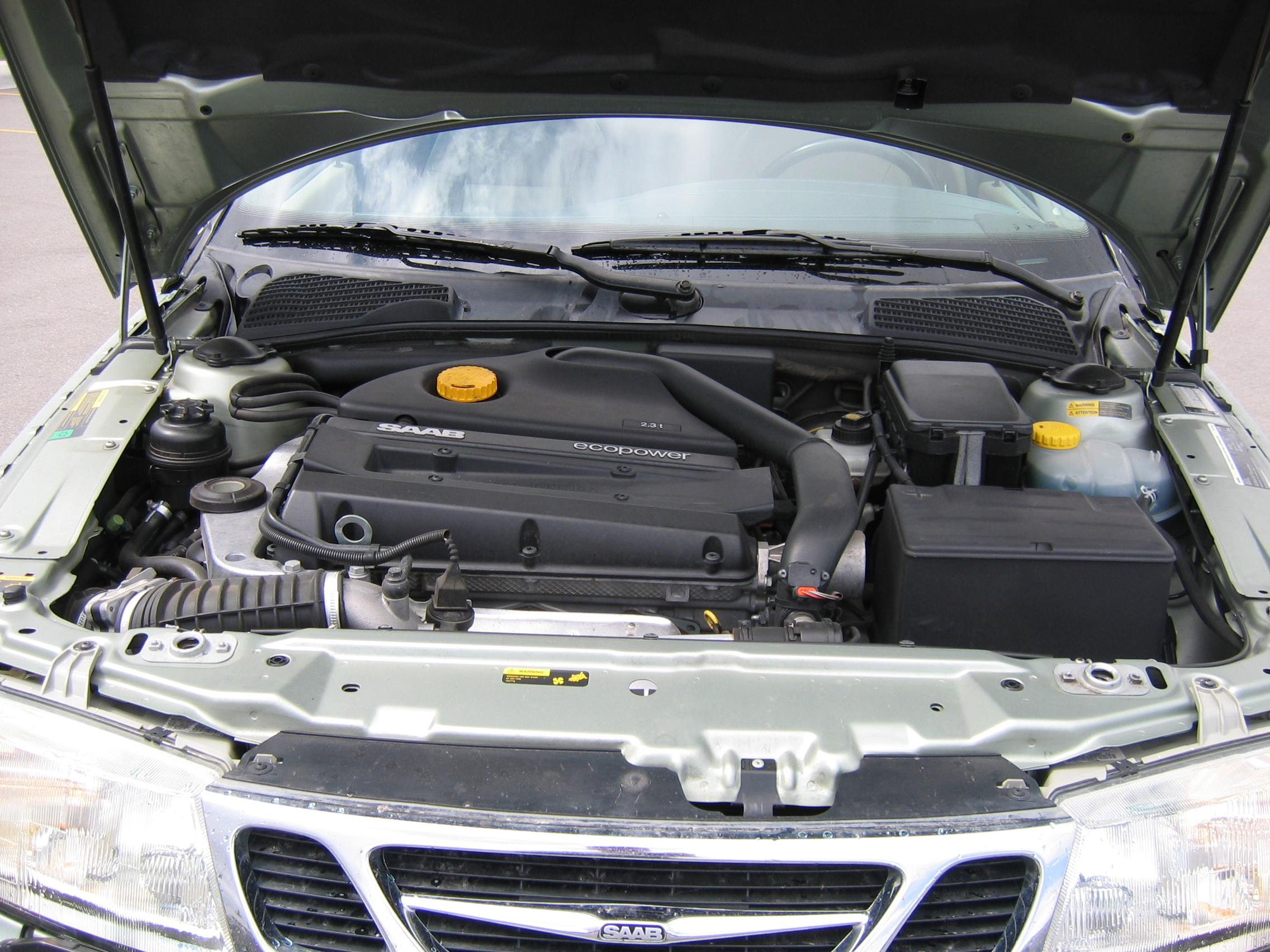
Saab B235 engine in a Saab 9-5. Note the black Saab Direct Ignition cassette, which is characteristic of the Trionic 7 engine management system.

The B205 and B235 engines are an evolution of the B204 and B234 engines. They were introduced in the 1998 Saab 9-5 giving reduced fuel consumption and emissions with improved refinement. The changes included lightweight internal components:lighter valves, softer valve springs, lighter pistons, and lower-drag oil pump. Another development was the introduction of the Trionic 7 torque demand type engine management system. Trionic 7 equipped engines have the black direct ignition casing on top of the engine rather than the red of the Trionic 5.

The base version was used on the first generation Saab 9-3 and Saab 9-5, with power output varying across the models and markets.

The B205E/L and the B235E use Garrett GT1752S turbochargers, while the B205R and B235L/R use Mitsubishi Heavy Industries TD04HL-15T-5.

Specifications
Engine	Years	Power	Torque	Turbocharger	Notes
B205E	—N/a	150 hp (112 kW) at 5500 rpm	240 N⋅m (177 lb⋅ft) at 1800 rpm	Garrett GT1752S	–
B205L	—N/a	185 hp (138 kW) at 5500 rpm	280 N⋅m (207 lb⋅ft) at 1800 rpm	Garrett GT1752S	–
B205R	—N/a	205 hp (153 kW) at 5500 rpm	280 N⋅m (207 lb⋅ft) (Manual); 250 N⋅m (184 lb⋅ft) (Auto)	Mitsubishi TD04HL-15T-5	–
B235E	1998–2000	170 hp (127 kW) at 5500 rpm	280 N⋅m (207 lb⋅ft) at 1800 rpm	Garrett GT1752S	–
B235E	2001–	185 hp (138 kW) at 5500 rpm	280 N⋅m (207 lb⋅ft) at 1800 rpm	Garrett GT1752S	–
B235L	2004–2005	220 hp (164 kW) at 5500 rpm	310 N⋅m (229 lb⋅ft) at 2500 rpm	Mitsubishi TD04HL-15T-5	Mechanically identical to B235R with detuned factory ECU map
B235R	1999–2001	230 hp (172 kW) at 5500 rpm	350 N⋅m (258 lb⋅ft); 370 N⋅m (273 lb⋅ft) Overboost (Manual)	Mitsubishi TD04HL-15T-5	–
B235R	2002–2005	250 hp (186 kW) at 5300 rpm	350 N⋅m (258 lb⋅ft); 370 N⋅m (273 lb⋅ft) Overboost (Manual)	Mitsubishi TD04HL-15T-5	–
B235R	2006–2009	260 hp (194 kW) at 5300 rpm	350 N⋅m (258 lb⋅ft); 370 N⋅m (273 lb⋅ft) Overboost (Manual)	Mitsubishi TD04HL-15T-5	–

== BAIC ==
BAIC offers the Saab H engine in various configurations on several of its models. The B205RGA and B235RGA, 2.0 and 2.3 litre turbo engines are available similar to those used in Saabs. Further BAIC offers a smaller 1.8 litre displacement version named B185RGA. This version was developed to meet requirement for government vehicle with maximum displacement of 1.8 litres. BAIC continued the development of the Saab H engine. In 2015, a B236R prototype was unveiled at the Shanghai Autoshow. This engine design incorporates variable valve timing and an EGR system which allows the engine to comply with Euro 6 emission standards.

The BAIC BJ40L is available with a 201 hp (150 kW) engine named B201R and a 231 hp (172 kW) engine named B231R. A 177 hp (132 kW) engine named B205EFA is offered in the Senova X65. The BAIC BJ80 is also available with the 231 hp (172 kW) B231R engine variant. The B201R and B231R models do not use Saab's Trionic engine management system and direct ignition cassette.

BAIC H engine models
Engine	Displacement	Power	Torque	CR.	Bore × Stroke
B185RGA	1,799 cc (109.8 cu in)	177 hp (132 kW) at 5500 rpm	240 N⋅m (177 lb⋅ft) at 1800–4800 rpm	9.2:1	85.7 mm × 78 mm (3.37 in × 3.07 in)
B201R	1,992 cc (121.6 cu in)	201 hp (150 kW) at 5500 rpm	270 N⋅m (199 lb⋅ft) at 1900–4500 rpm	8.8:1	90 mm × 78 mm (3.54 in × 3.07 in)
B205EFA	1,992 cc (121.6 cu in)	177 hp (132 kW) at 5500 rpm	240 N⋅m (177 lb⋅ft) at 1800–4800 rpm	9.0:1	90 mm × 78 mm (3.54 in × 3.07 in)
B205RGA	1,992 cc (121.6 cu in)	204 hp (152 kW) at 5500 rpm	290 N⋅m (214 lb⋅ft) at 1800 rpm	8.8:1	90 mm × 78 mm (3.54 in × 3.07 in)
B231R	2,290 cc (140 cu in)	231 hp (172 kW) at 5500 rpm	350 N⋅m (258 lb⋅ft) at 1900–4300 rpm	9.1:1	90 mm × 90 mm (3.54 in × 3.54 in)
B235RGA	2,290 cc (140 cu in)	250 hp (186 kW) at 5300 rpm	350 N⋅m (258 lb⋅ft) at 1900 rpm	9.3:1	90 mm × 90 mm (3.54 in × 3.54 in)
B236R	2,290 cc (140 cu in)	250 hp (186 kW) at 5300 rpm	350 N⋅m (258 lb⋅ft) at 1900 rpm	9.3:1	90 mm × 90 mm (3.54 in × 3.54 in)

== Successor to the Saab H-Engine ==
The H-engine ended production with the 1st Generation Saab 9-5 in 2009 when the intellectual property was transferred to BAIC. Starting in 2003 with the 9-3 Sport Sedan, Saab began utilizing the L850 engine Ecotec. Beginning in 2010 with the 2nd generation 9-5, all Saabs utilized the Ecotec. There were some technologies carried over into the Ecotec line from the Saab H-engine, but for the most part there is very little similarity between the two engine families. Saab continued to use its Trionic engine management system with the Ecotec.

== See also ==
- Saab Variable Compression engine
- Saab V8
