= Trionic 8 =

Engine management system

The Trionic 8 is an advanced engine management system in the Trionic series, created by Saab Automobile. It is used in both Saab 9-3 and Opel Vectra vehicles, and is available with 150, 175 and 210 horsepower (160 kW) engines. It will also be used for a flexifuel version starting production spring 2007. Saab Trionic T8 has been developed by Saab and is a very advanced engine management system. The Engine Control Module (ECM) is used principally to regulated the air mass, fuel and ignition timing.

== Functionality ==
Trionic monitors ionization rates at each spark plug to individually control and adjust the combustion process for each cylinder. Other primary functions are:

- Ignition timing
- Fuel injection
- Turbo boost pressure
- Air mass measurement
- Throttle

== Throttle regulation ==
Trionic 8 calculates how much power the driver wants as early as possible to avoid turbo kick or lag, therefore making driving smooth. As the driver depresses the accelerator pedal, it acts on a pedal position sensor integrated in the pedal bracket. This information, in the form of a voltage, is connected to the ECM which converts the voltage value to a torque request from the driver.

The torque request is then processed by the ECM with regard to current operating conditions and limitations. The result is an air mass request to achieve the torque requested by the ECM. The driver's requested torque can be higher than that requested by ECM when, for example:

- Maximum engine torque at the current operating point has already been attained
- The traction control system (TCS) intervenes
- the knock control system intervenes

The ECM regulates the throttle area (opening angle) together with the turbo wastegate so that the correct torque is attained, i.e. air mass per combustion. Fuel injection is sequential and regulated with air mass per combustion and engine speed as parameters.

Advantages

This system has the following advantages:

- Turbocharger delay can be almost eliminated
- Exhaust emissions are reduced during changes in load
- Idle speed control is integrated
- Load compensation is possible over the entire load and engine speed range
- Efficient engine torque limitation is achieved over the entire load and engine speed range
- Cruise control can easily be integrated into the system

== Ignition ==
Ignition takes place with individual ignition coils placed on the respective spark plug. The spark plugs, together with the ignition coils and combustion detection module (CDM), are used to detect combustion and possible knocking. This means there is no need for a camshaft position sensor or separate knock sensor.

== Comparison with Trionic T7 ==
Compared with the earlier Trionic T7, the following functions are new:

Throttle body actuator (604)

- Contains throttle position sensor and throttle motor with associated reduction gear.
- The throttle body is spherical to improve the throttle area control with low loads.
- No mechanical limp-home function as with T7.

Accelerator position sensor (379)

- Integrated in accelerator pedal bracket.

Ignition coil with integrated power module (320)

- Separate inductive ignition coils with ionization current measurement.
- Power stage integrated in ignition coils

Combustion Detection Module (740)

- Combustion Detection Module (CDM) processes the ion current signal from the ignition coils first.
- Provides ECM with information on combustion quality and possible knocking.

Exhaust temperature sensor (602)

- Measures temperature of exhaust gases after catalytic converter.
- Used as enable criteria for catalytic converter diagnosis.

Pressure sensor, atmospheric pressure (539)

- New model located on engine instead of integrated in control module.
- Same function as in earlier Trionic T7 system.

Power steering fluid pressure switch (739)

- Informs ECM when power steering servo pressure exceeds 17 bar.
- Used for idle speed compensation.

Level monitor, engine oil (243)

- Informs ECM when oil level is low.
- Used for indication on Saab Information Display (SID).

Level sensor, fuel (46)

- Informs ECM of current fuel level.
- Used for certain diagnoses and trip computer, and for indicating fuel level on main instrument unit (MIU).

Relay, start relay (517)

- Controlled by ECM.

Radiator fan control

- Radiator fan logic is in ECM that also activates the radiator fan relays.
- Radiator fan can run in four different modes.

Generator (2)

- ECM controls whether the generator should charge or not.
- Used to engage generator charging with a certain delay after starting and in certain cases disengage generator charging. In this case, the engine load will be reduced temporarily when idling to stabilise the idling speed.

Pressure monitor, engine oil (44)

- Informs ECM when oil pressure is low.
- Used for indicating on MIU and SID.

Pressure sensor, A/C (620)

- Informs ECM of current pressure on the A/C system high pressure side.
- Used for load compensating, radiator fan operation and is sent out as a bus message to be used by ACC.

== Tuning ==
Due to countermeasures implemented by Saab to protect their intellectual property, Trionic 8 systems are more difficult to reprogram. Despite those countermeasures, some tuning companies do offer performance-tuned Trionic 8 maps.
