= Trionic =

Series of engine management system

Trionic is an engine management system developed by Saab Automobile. It consists of an engine control unit (ECU) that controls ignition timing, fuel injection, and acts as a boost controller.The name 'Trionic' is a portmanteau of the numerical prefix 'tri-' (meaning 'three') and 'ion' from the fact that it uses ion current. This ion current is measured by the spark plugs between combustion events which acts as a sensor for knock, misfire and synchronization detection.

The ion current stream which was developed within the ion sensing system due to combustion can be deduced by monitoring the secondary current of the ignition coil. Using the value and wave shape of the current, after the actual spark event, the quality of the actual combustion process is determined, thus allowing the engine control unit to optimize the timing of the spark for the best engine performance while keeping emissions low on a much wider range of rpms.

Since Trionic 7, the throttle and thereby the air charge has also been electronically controlled, but the name "Trionic" was not changed accordingly as it was determined that the name had value.

== History ==
The SAAB Trionic engine management system was developed for the 9000 and 'New Generation' 900 turbocharged engines. The engine management system was first utilized on the Saab B204 and B234 "H" engines to monitor and control the fuel injection system and turbocharging pressure control.

The Trionic 5.2 and 5.5 systems utilized the manifold absolute pressure (MAP) sensor and the intake air charge temperature sensor to calculate the fuel injection curves, while the Trionic 7 and 8 systems are mass air flow type. Both systems have substantial differences that prevent utilization of components between the two. Generally speaking, engine tuners prefer the easier to work with Trionic 5 systems over the Trionic 7 and 8 which are more restrictive in what can be manipulated within the software.

The intellectual rights to the Trionic 5 and 7 systems were sold in 2009 to BAIC, along with the Saab H Engine that it was designed for, as part of Saab's restructuring and transfer of ownership of General Motors to Spyker.

== Models and ECU information ==
	Trionic T5.2	Trionic T5.5	Trionic 7	Trionic 8
Released	1993	1994	1998	2003
Processor	MC 68332	MC 68332	MC YQQCU	MC 68377
User ROM	128 kB	256 kB	512 kB	2048 kB
Features	TCS/ETC Optional	TCS/ETC Optional /intake heatplate Optional	98-99 Does not use TCS on four cylinder models, optional on 00-02 four cylinder models	??

Trionic systems are shortened to indicate their version; for e.g. T5, T7, T8, etc. The engines with T5 had red direct ignition modules which differentiated them visually from the T7 models which had a black ignition module. The ignition module on both T5 and T7 are an integral ignition coil and electronics that plug directly onto the spark plugs without the use of spark plug wires that were typically used in most engines at the time.

SAAB Models Utilizing Trionic Engine Management System:

- 2nd Generation 900 ("NG900") 1994-1998 – T5
- 9000 1994-1998 – T5
- 1st Generation 9-3 1998-2000 – T5 (Except Viggen, which is T7)
- 1st Generation 9-3 2000 to 2002 – T7
- 1st Generation 9-5 1998-2010 4Cyl – T7
- 2nd Generation 9-3 2003 to 2011 4cyl – T8

== Glossary ==
Sources include: Engine management system SAAB Trionic T5.5

- APC, Automatic Performance Control
- CDM, Combustion Detection Module
- ECU, Engine control unit
- EGT, Exhaust gas temperature
- ETC, Electronic throttle control
- MAP, Manifold Absolute Pressure
- MIU, Main Instrument Unit
- ORVR, On board Refueling Vapor Recovery system
- PWM, Pulse-width modulation
- SID, Saab Information Display
- TCS, Traction control system
- TPS, Throttle position sensor
- TWICE, Theft Warning Integrated Central Electronics
- VSS, Vehicle Speed Sensor
- WOT, Wide Open Throttle
