= Saab 9000 =

Swedish car produced from 1984–1998

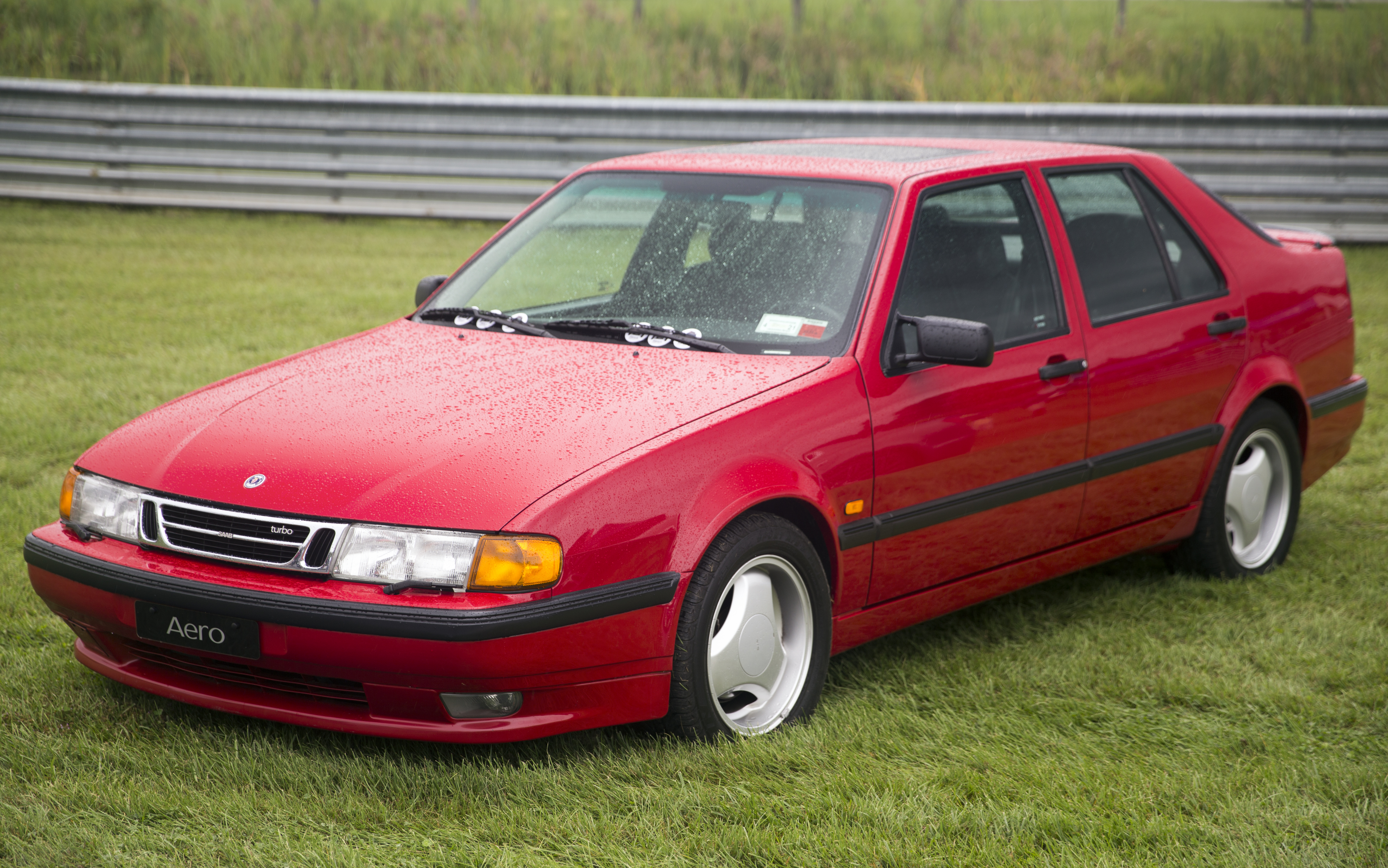
- 1995 Saab 9000 Aero saloon

Overview
- Manufacturer: Saab
- Production: 24 May 1984 – 6 May 1998
- Assembly: Sweden: Trollhättan (Trollhättan Assembly); Finland: Uusikaupunki (Saab-Valmet: 1984–1991)
- Designer: Björn Envall; Giorgetto Giugiaro at Italdesign

Body and chassis
- Class: Executive car (E)
- Body style: 4-door saloon (CD); 5-door hatchback (CC, CS)
- Layout: Transverse front-engine, front-wheel drive
- Platform: Type four
- Related: Alfa Romeo 164; Fiat Croma; Lancia Thema

Powertrain
- Engine: 2.0 L B202/B204 I4; 2.0 L B202/B204 turbocharged I4; 2.3 L B234 I4; 2.3 L B234 turbocharged I4; 3.0 L GM B308 V6
- Transmission: 4-speed ZF 4HP18 automatic 5-speed F25 manual

Dimensions
- Wheelbase: 2,672 mm (105.2 in)
- Length: CC: 4,620 mm (181.9 in); CD: 4,782 mm (188.3 in); CS: 4,761 mm (187.4 in)
- Width: 1,763 mm (69.4 in)
- Height: 1,420 mm (55.9 in)
- Curb weight: 1,410–1,475 kg (3,109–3,252 lb)

Chronology
- Successor: Saab 9-5

The Saab 9000 is an automobile produced by the Swedish company Saab from 1984 to 1998. Representing the company's foray into the executive car scene, it was developed as a result of the successes of the turbocharged 99 and 900 models. The 9000 remained in production until May 1998 and was replaced by the 9-5 in late 1997, although some final cars were produced into 1998. The Saab 9000 was only available with petrol engines, in two different 5-door hatchback designs or as a 4-door notchback.

== Introduction ==
Saab designed the 9000 as part of its joint development Type Four platform in conjunction with the Italian automaker Fiat Automobiles. Fiat developed and sold its own derivative versions from the platform as the more basic Fiat Croma, the luxury-themed Lancia Thema, and the sports-oriented Alfa Romeo 164. Unlike the 164, which shares only the chassis, the Croma and Thema are outwardly similar to the 9000. As such, much of the bodywork appeared interchangeable between the 9000, Croma and Thema; for example, the doors. However, because Saab fitted heavier side impact protection and made other changes to the design, none of the components could be interchanged between the cars. Fiat had designed the Croma with no consideration of American crash test requirements, which forced Saab to strengthen the body by fitting various reinforcements. Thus, the front of the Saab is radically different from the Italian siblings due to the much improved crash protection. Only seven parts are actually interchangeable. Additionally, where the other Type Four cars used independent MacPherson struts all round, the 9000 used them only on the front suspension, with its rear suspension instead using a beam axle. The 9000 was designed by Giorgetto Giugiaro and Saab's in-house designer Björn Envall.

Despite being shorter overall than the 900 which was still produced in parallel, the 9000 has a longer wheelbase and greater interior space with 3.5 cubic metres (120 cu ft) of interior space, 0.67 cubic metres (24 cu ft) in the boot and 1.6 cubic metres (57 cu ft) with rear seats folded). Qualifying as an EPA-rated large car, a distinction shared only with the contemporary Rolls-Royce in America. This was achieved by installing the engine transversely to the direction of travel in the 9000 (instead of longitudinally as in the 900). Unlike the 900, the 9000 kept the ignition switch in the more conventional steering column position rather than between the front seats.

In total, 503,087 Saab 9000s were manufactured. These are divided into: 216,385 Saab 9000 CC (MY 1985–1991), 174,525 Saab 9000 CS (MY 1992–1998), 112,177 Saab 9000 CD (MY 1988–1997).

== History ==
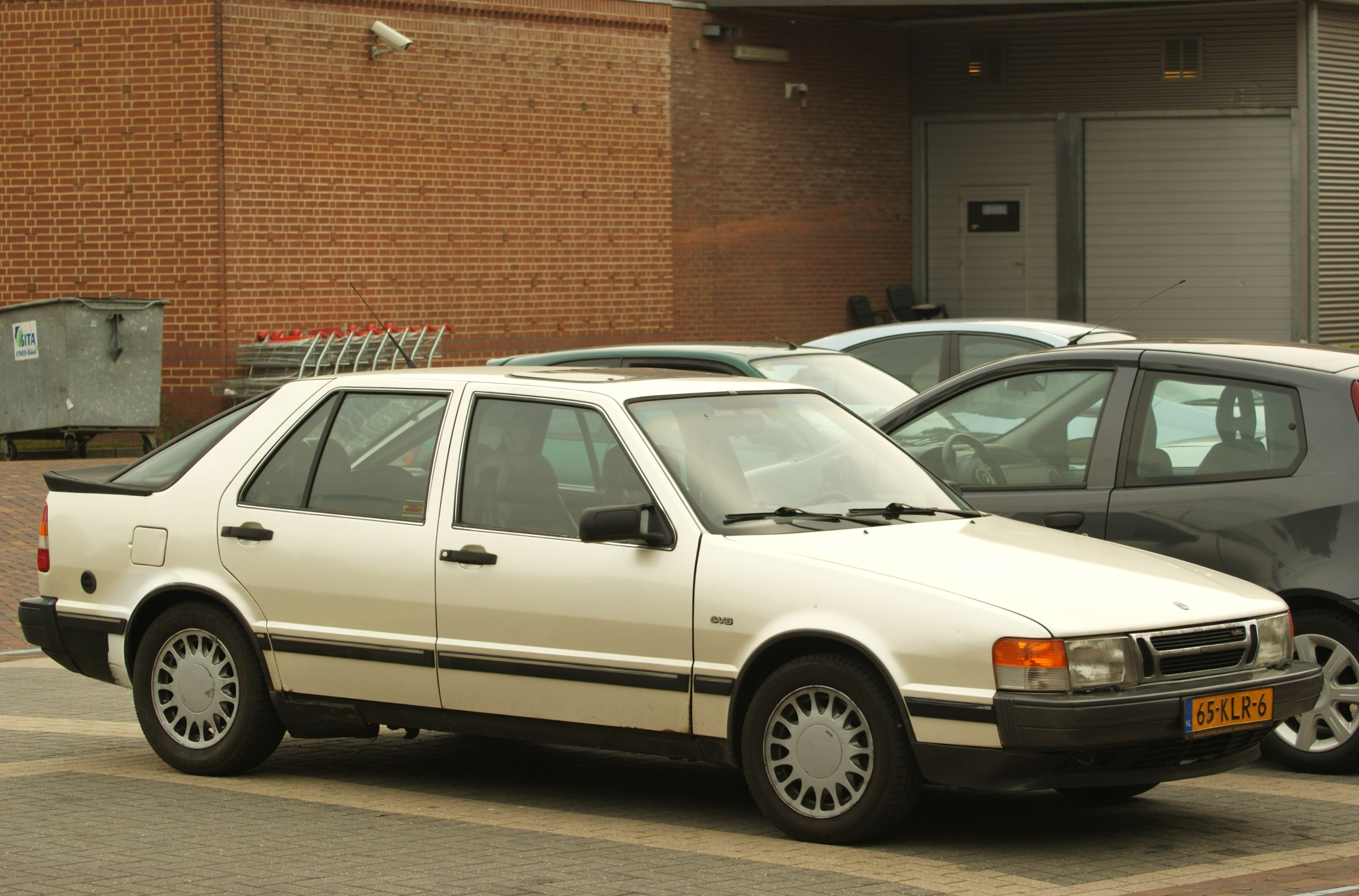
origin Saab 9000 CC with "steep nose"

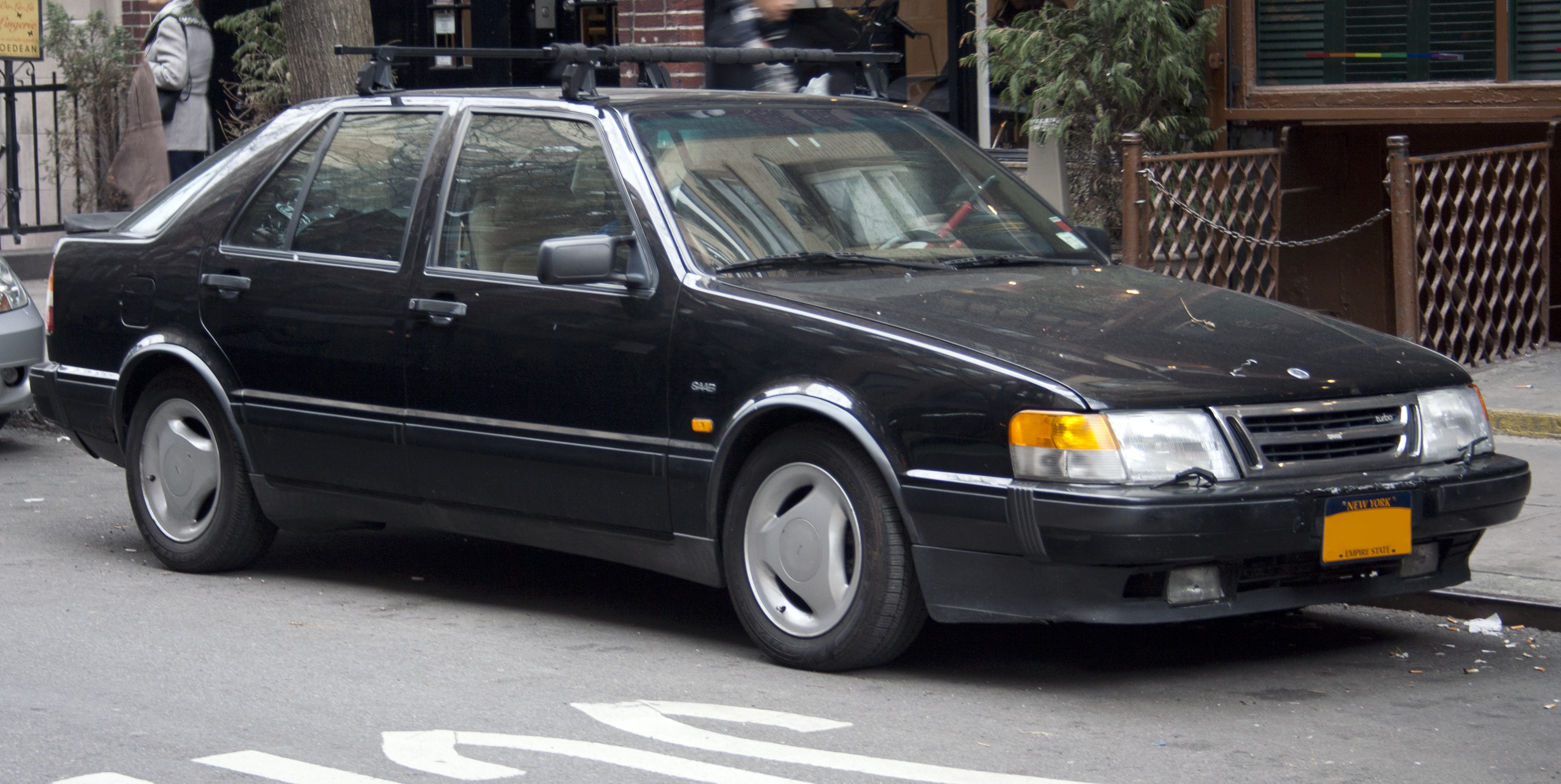
facelift Saab 9000 CC with "sloping front" (like CD)

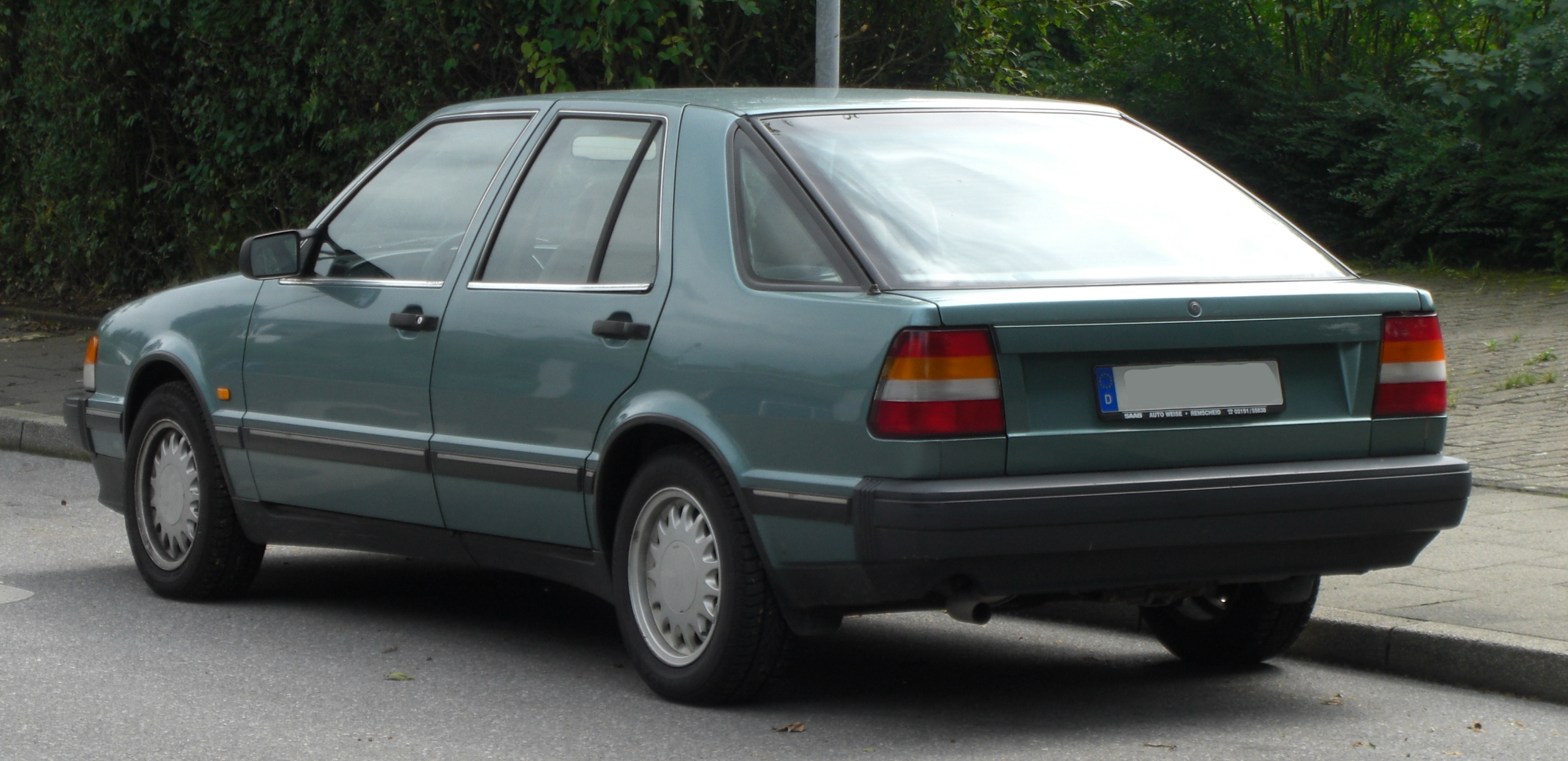
9000 CC origin and facelift share the same fender

The 9000 was launched to the motoring press at a conference at Kolmården Game Park on 24 May 1984 and 1985 in the European market. This original model called "Saab 9000 Turbo 16" was a five-door hatchback, only available with a manual gearbox and the 2.0-litre turbocharged 4-cylinder engine with 16 valves, already known from the 900. Maximum power was quoted to be 175 hp DIN (129 kW) without a catalytic converter. The 9000 has Drag coefficient of C_{d} 0.34, very competitive for the time. Earlier on in the development, the PRV engine had also been considered as well as the Ford Vulcan engine from the upcoming Ford Taurus.

The Saab 9000 was awarded Best Prestige Car 1985 by the French magazine L'Action Automobile. Cars built in the first year had problems with weak structural rigidity and developed a reputation for cracks and fatigue if fitted with tow hooks or sunroofs. Earlier production 9000s were not able to pass the American crash test standards but the car was continuously reinforced during its production run.

At the end of 1985, for the 1986 model year, the 9000 was rolled out in the most important foreign market: the US. It was fitted with the 2.0-litre turbocharged 4-cylinder engine, now with exhaust gas purification via catalytic converter and was rated at 160 hp DIN (118 kW). Saab also introduced a fuel injected naturally aspirated engine for the 9000 during the same year, available in all of Saab's markets. This engine is rated at 125 hp DIN (92 kW) with catalytic converters and 128 hp DIN (94 kW) without catalytic converters. The naturally aspirated engine is based on the turbocharged engine and features four valves per cylinder, electronic ignition, and a knock sensor.

In the autumn of 1986, Saab organised a record attempt with the 9000, which received much attention in the US and internationally, at the Alabama International Motor Speedway at Talladega, now the Talladega Superspeedway. "Saab Turbo--In The Long Run" took place over 20 days and 20 nights. "The main purpose of the Long Run project is to test the endurance of our cars as part of our ongoing testing program," explained Olle Granlund, head of Saab's engine and transmission department and the person in charge of this project. All three 9000 Turbo 16s passed the 100,000 kilometres (62,000 mi) mark in 21 days, the lead car breaking 21 international and two world speed records in the process. In memory of this event, Saab sold special models of its cars named "Talladega" in the prospective years, not only for the 9000 but also for other model series. Furthermore, the event was repeated 10 years later in 1996 with models of the "NG 900".

For the 1987 model year a 4-speed automatic transmission made by ZF became available. For the 1988 model year, Saab introduced a 4-door saloon variant of the 9000 known as the CD. The front of the Sedan was different (more modern) and more streamlined than the hatchback model. This involved smoothing the edges of the headlamps and grille and sloping the front outwards. Saab adapted the design of the saloon to the current facelift of the 900, which had already received a similar new front-end design for the 1987 model year. This re-design marked a departure from the more upright front styling of the 1984 model, which was also similar to the old design of the 900 from 1978 to 1986.

From the 1988 model year, all 9000 variants were equipped with a Saab Information Display (SID) which showed fuel consumption, distance to an empty fuel tank, alternator output voltage, outside temperature, and lowest battery voltage during vehicle start. If the outside temperature fell to −3 to 3 °C (27 to 37 °F), the temperature display is automatically selected to warn of possible black ice road conditions. A separate pictogram monitored door and hatch opening and exterior light bulb condition. 1988 also marked the introduction of pyrotechnic seat belt tensioners for the front seats. Saab Direct Ignition (DI) was also introduced in 1988 with the 9000 CD and its B202 turbocharged engine.

For the 1989 model year, the B202 turbo engine built in the CC got the new DI motor management. The output of the B202 turbo increased slightly from 160 to 163 hp (118 to 120 kW) DIN for the catalyzed turbo model and from 125 to 128 hp (92 to 94 kW) DIN for the catalyzed, naturally aspirated engine, and from 128 to 133 hp (94 to 98 kW) DIN in the uncatalyzed model.

For the 1990 model year, Saab introduced the newly developed and enlarged B234 2.3-litre engine, rated at 146 hp DIN (107 kW) for the naturally aspirated variation and always equipped with a catalyst. This version develops 150 hp SAE (112 kW) in US-market cars. From autumn 1990 for the 1991 model year in Europe (autumn 1991 in US), the new engine also became available also with a turbocharger, rated at 195 hp DIN (143 kW). Unlike the other engines, each of which was also used in the 900 classic, the B234 engine was only used in the 9000 (and later in the 900 NG in the version without turbo).

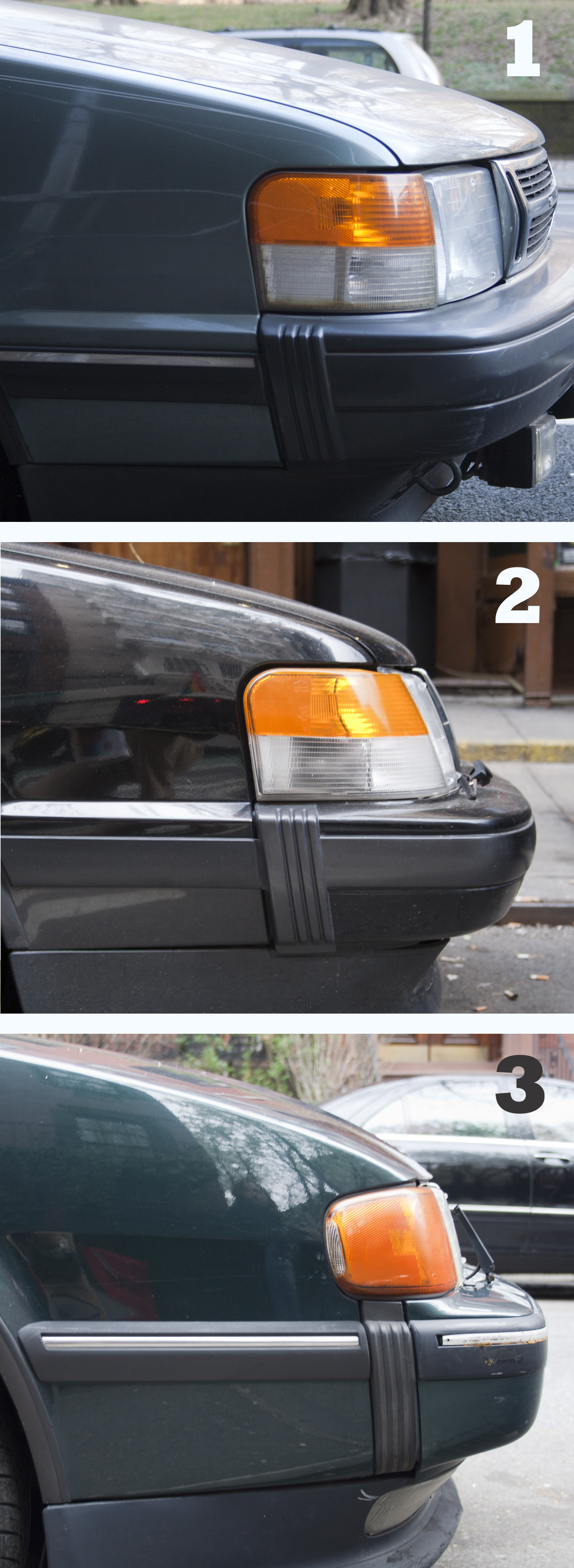
The facelifts of the 9000

For the 1991 (Europe) and 1992 (US) model year, Saab also adopted the sloping front design of the CD as a short-lived facelift for the CC hatchback without touching the rear. With this, the flat front design of the 90, 99, 900 and the origin 9000 was finally over. But this design existed only for a single year on the CC in most markets (the CD notchback retained its old design until the 1994 model year). Also new during 1991 was the ozone-friendly air-conditioning system using R134a - the first in the world. Saab also offered conversion kits for existing, air conditioned 9000 models.

The next bigger facelift for the 9000 5-door hatchback was followed by the introduction of a partial redesign for the 1992 model year in Europe (1993 model year in the US), known as the CS. At the release of the CS, the original hatchback variant from 1985–1991/1992 model years was retrospectively designated CC to differentiate it from the newer model. The "old" CC continued to be sold alongside the facelifted model in some markets as an entry-level model and particularly in the US, where the new CS was not available until 1993.

A new turbocharger management system, Trionic 5 and later Trionic 7, was equipped from the 1993 model year onwards in engines with DI (the Trionic system used resistor spark plugs to detect for engine knock in place of the knock sensors incorporated into the engine block in the previous APC system). The model range was also revised to provide some uniformity to the model designations on all markets. They became CS/CSE and CD/CDE:

- the CS / CD were equipped with basic equipment
- the CSE / CDE came with most available equipment from factory

In principle, both trim levels could be combined with the engines available in the respective model year and market. This means that even a "simple" CS could be ordered with the 200 hp turbocharged engine, for example.

For the 1995 model year, a 3.0-litre B308 V6 engine from General Motors rated at 210 PS (154 kW) was introduced as standard for the CDE trim and optional for the CSE trim. However, the engine was not offered in all markets.

=== End of production ===
The four-door CD/E models were discontinued in all markets in summer 1997 (already discontinued in the US in summer 1995). The production of the performance-oriented Aero model also ended in summer 1997. Only 1,400 units of the 9000 were produced for the 1998 model year (starting in August 1997), and of these, only 400 were exported to the United States, the main foreign market for Saab. In late 1997, Saab introduced the successor of the 9000 called the 9-5.

== Models ==
=== 9000 CC (hatchback) ===
Originally known simply as the 9000, the original hatchback variant was later given the CC identifier, standing for "Combi Coupe", to differentiate it from the CD ("Corps Diplomatique") saloon and later CS hatchback. Saab also used this different identifier for models of the 900. While originally equipped with an upright front design, this was replaced by the facelift adopting the sloped design language in the 1990 model year that had earlier debuted on the 9000 CD saloon in 1988.

As with the 900 CC, the 9000 CC had some special models in some countries, such as the 9000 Turbo 16 SP in France (SP stands for "Sport and Performance"). In Germany and Switzerland there were also a special edition named "Saab 9000 Turbo 16 S", with an airflow kit and the B202 turbocharged engine with a catalytic converter tuned up to 195 hp (for 1990). But the most popular special series is the so-called "Talladega" (US and most parts of Europe) or "Carlsson" (UK), both models available as CC and CD saloon versions. The "Carlsson" takes its name from legendary Swedish rally ace Erik Carlsson, who secured numerous wins for Saab in the sixties. In markets outside of the UK, it was known as the Talladega in honour of the 19 endurance records set by three standard turbocharged 9000s at Talladega Speedway in the US in 1986. Since 1988, the CC was available both with and without catalytic converter. Saab had scared the power to 175 PS (160 PS original) in the catalytic converter engine and 192 PS (175 PS original) in non-catalyzed variants. The boost pressure was around 1.0 bar. Furthermore, a new "black box" (APC) had been installed in the Talladega models which allows higher power. 9000 Carlsson models were produced with a paint-matched airflow body kit, spoiler, and a specially tuned turbocharged engine producing 195 PS (185 PS with catalytic converter) with the B202 turbo in 1990 up to 165 kW (225 PS) in 1991-92 with the B234 turbo and was only available with a manual transmission. The "Carlsson" was produced from 1990 to 1992 (changing from CC to CS design) with engine output up to 225 PS and can be described as the precursor of the Aero, which was introduced in 1993 with the CS design. A number of the Carlsson editions fitted with the B202 turbocharged engine were sold into the Australian market. In total 216,385 9000 CC were produced from 1985-1991 (43% of the total production numbers).

=== 9000 CD (saloon) ===
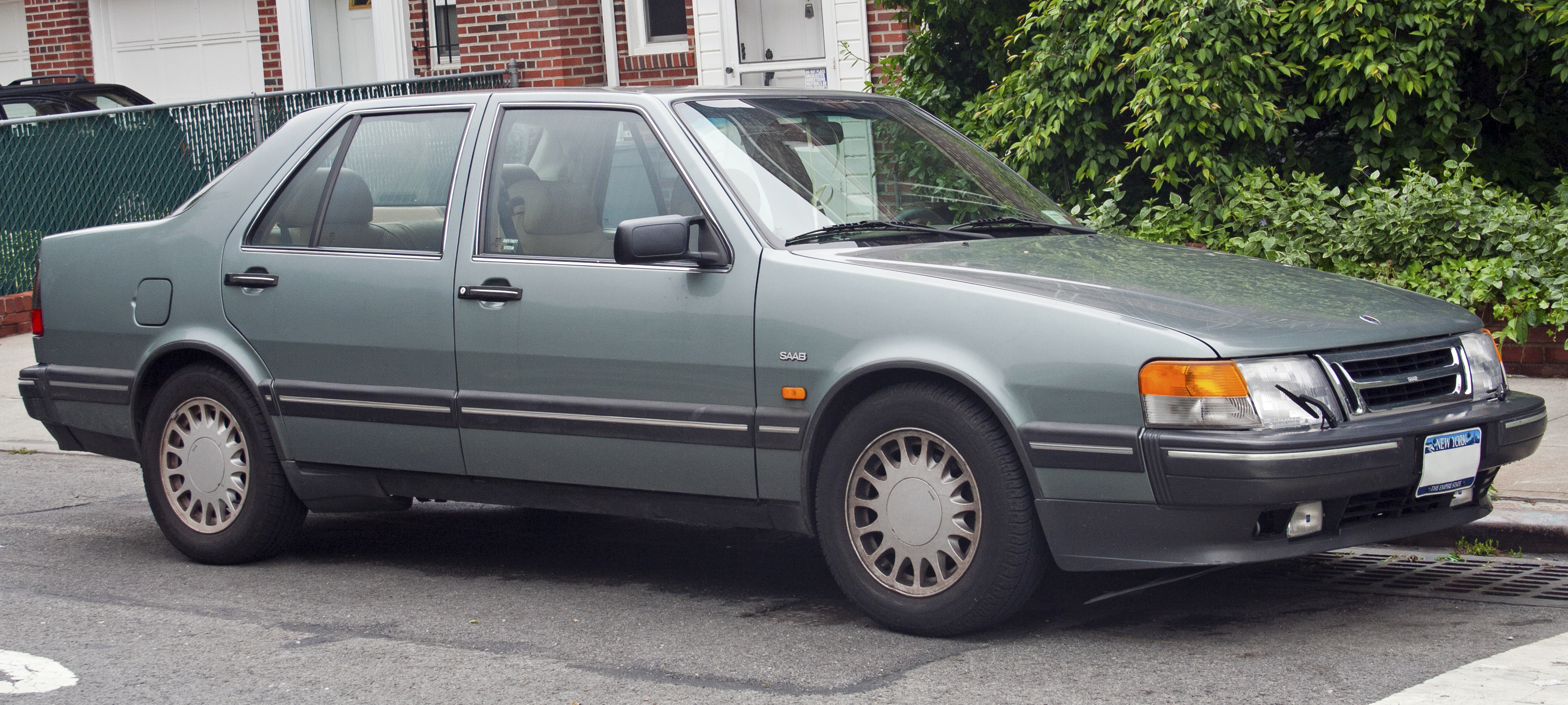

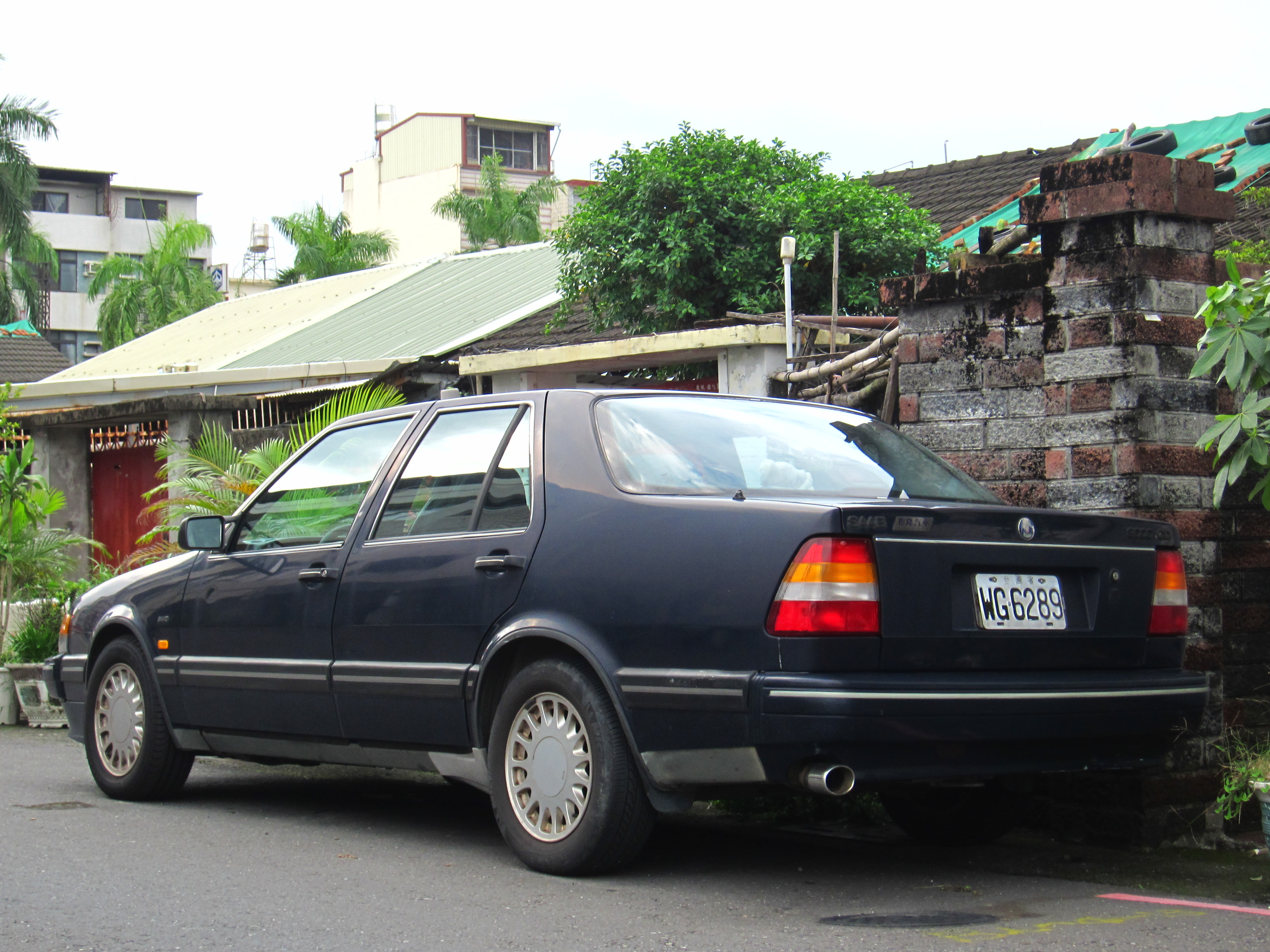
Saab 9000 CD (pre-facelift)

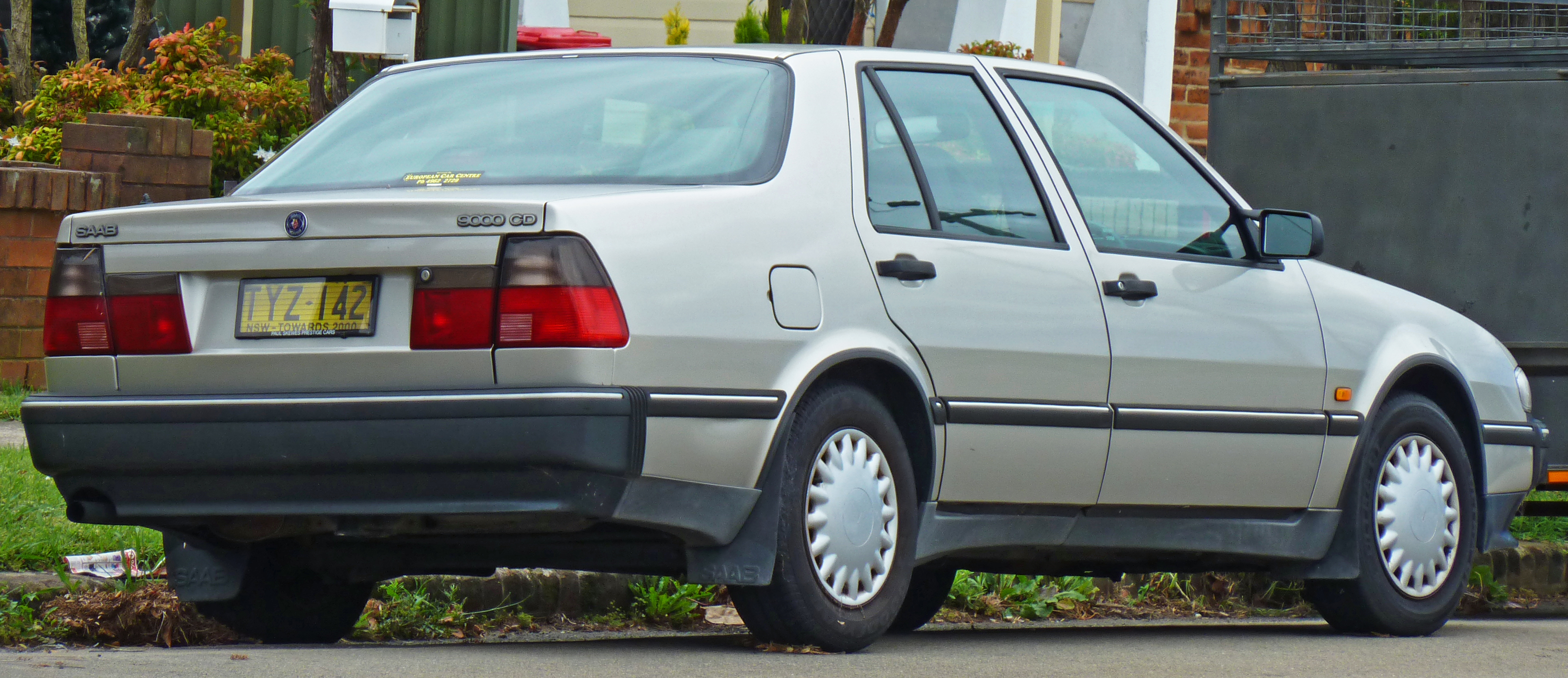
Saab 9000 CD (post-facelift)

The 9000 CD was introduced in Nice, France in January 1988. The CD was the four-door saloon body style featuring a slightly more aerodynamic front design which the CC did not receive until 1991. The redesigned rear gave the CD about 20% more torsional rigidity. Just as in the launch of the CC variant, the 9000 CD was initially available only with the B202 turbo engine, but Saab combined it right from the start with its new "DI ignition system" At the Birmingham Motor Show in September 1988, Saab premiered the non-turbocharged model of the CD with the naturally aspirated 2.0-litre inline-four. In 1990 Saab introduced the 150 PS (110 kW; 148 hp) 2.3-litre B234 normally aspirated engine for the CC and CD. Since then, the CD was available with the same basic engines as the CC, except the 225 PS "Aero" engine which was reserved for the liftbacks.

From the beginning, Saab had placed the CD above the hatchback model in terms of equipment and price. This was in keeping with the spirit of the times, which saw an expensive notchback model more as a car for business people (with or without a chauffeur) who did not need the cargo space of the CC. This is why Saab never offered the CD with a folding rear seat, which would have been at the expense of stability and peace and quiet in the interior. With the introduction of the 9000 2.3 Turbo CD "Griffin" for 1992 as the top model of the 9000 series, Saab finally placed itself in the luxury class. The Griffin was only available as notchback and only with the 2.3 Turbo engine and only 400 units were produced.

In 1994, for the 1995 model year, Saab redesigned the CD for the first time since its introduction, the model now receiving the same front end design as on the CS and a revised taillight arrangement. In some European markets, Saab revived the "Griffin" model from 1995 onwards. It was only available with the V6 engine, automatic transmission and with numerous luxury appointments, such as an optional second air conditioning unit in the boot for the rear occupants and with all available electric options, special eucalyptus green paint, walnut trim and rear window blinds.

Saab withdrew the notchback from the US market in the summer of 1995, but kept offering this bodystyle in other markets until summer 1997. Total production of the 9000 CD amounted to 112,177 units (22.3% of total production).

=== 9000 CS (hatchback) ===
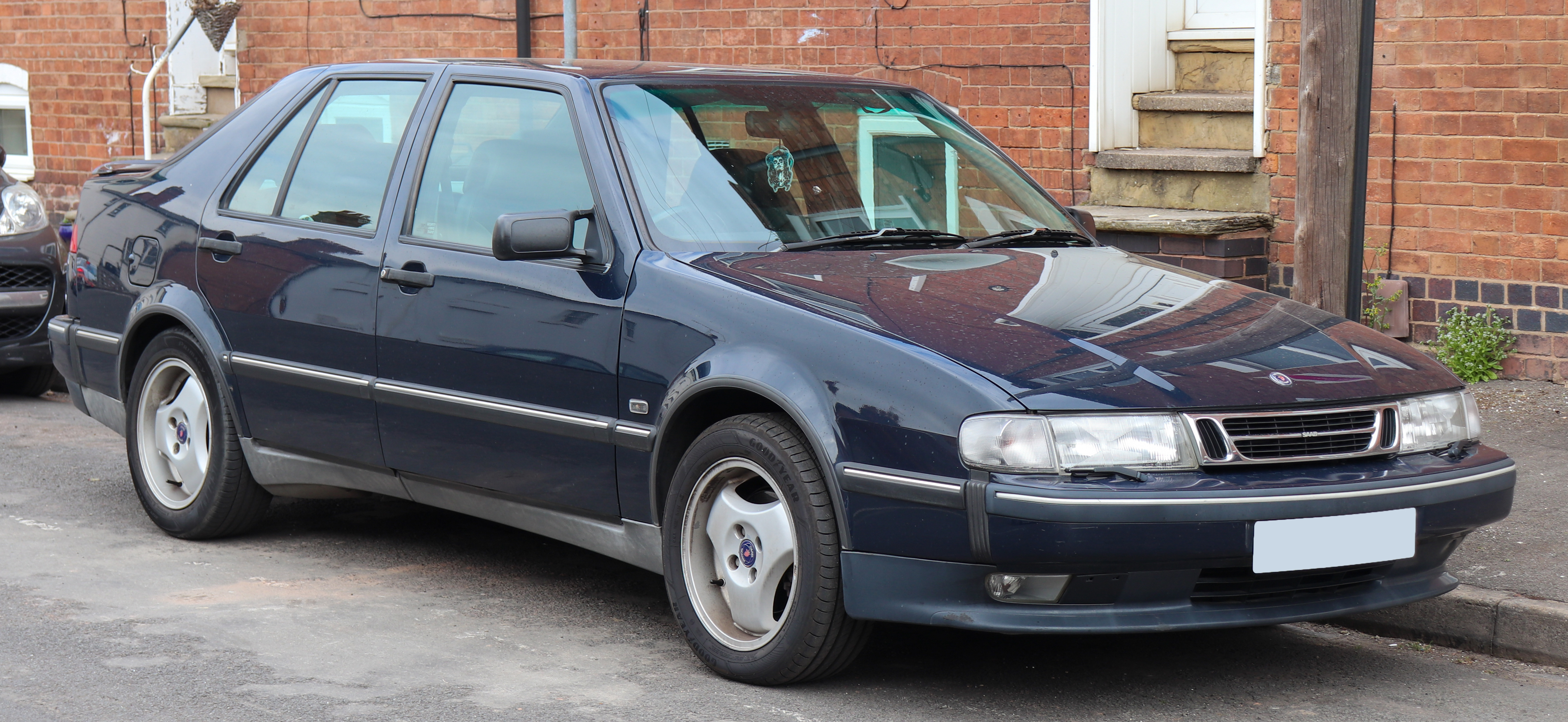

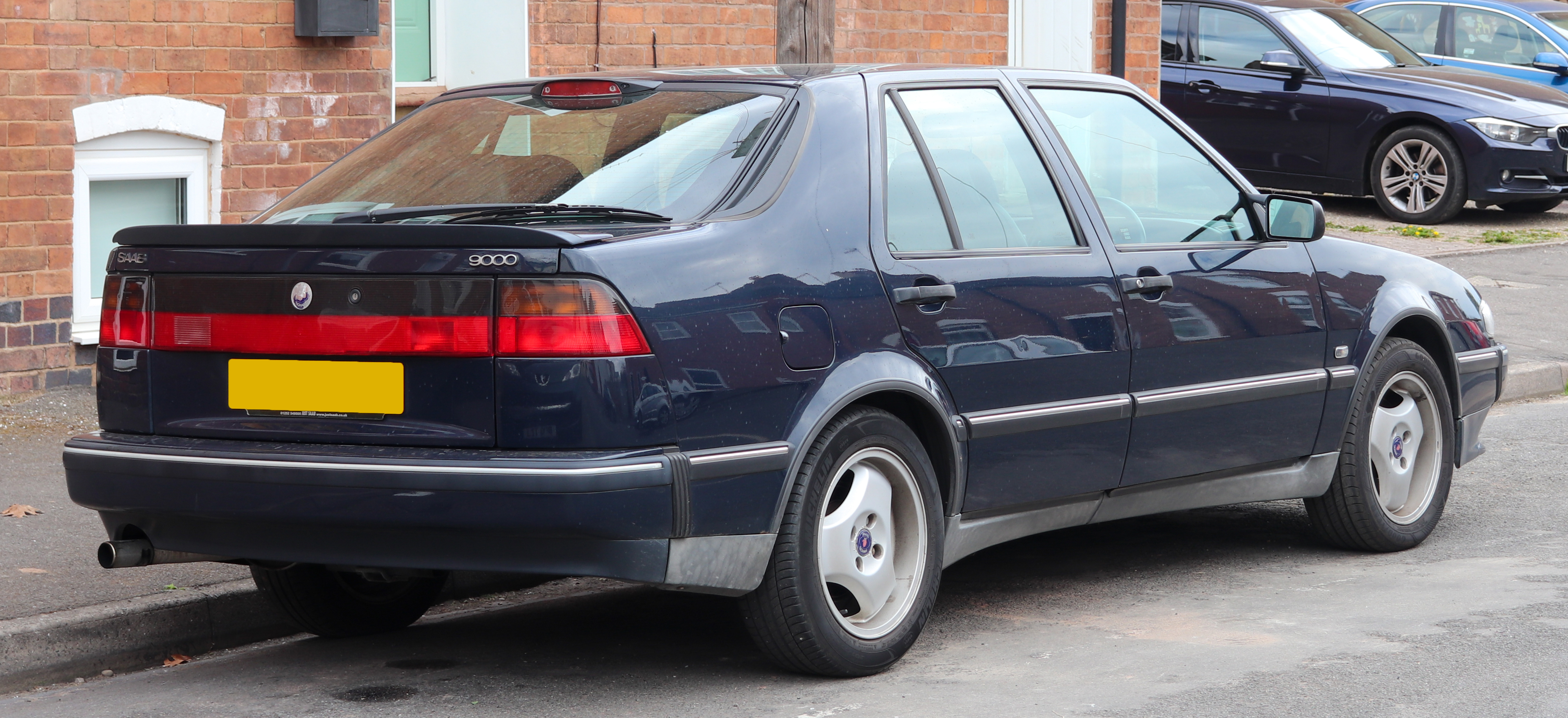
1996 Saab 9000 CS (Europe)

Saab presented the 9000 CS (Combi Sedan), an updated version of the former CC hatchback body variant, in Europe in autumn 1991 for the 1992 model year (in the US the CS was introduced in 1993). The CS featured a lowered front fascia with new headlights, new grille, some minor changes at the doors and a substantially redesigned rear-end. Although the interior design remained basically the same, there were some minor cosmetic changes. The deeper C-pillars and stronger construction at the rear increased torsional rigidity, which the original CC design had been criticized for lacking. The new body was also designed to meet upcoming (1994) Federal side impact standards.

The redesigned front and rear looked sleeker, but did not actually lower the wind resistance. However, lift was reduced, making the car more stable at high-speeds. The 9000 CS was fitted with a variety of Saab H engines.

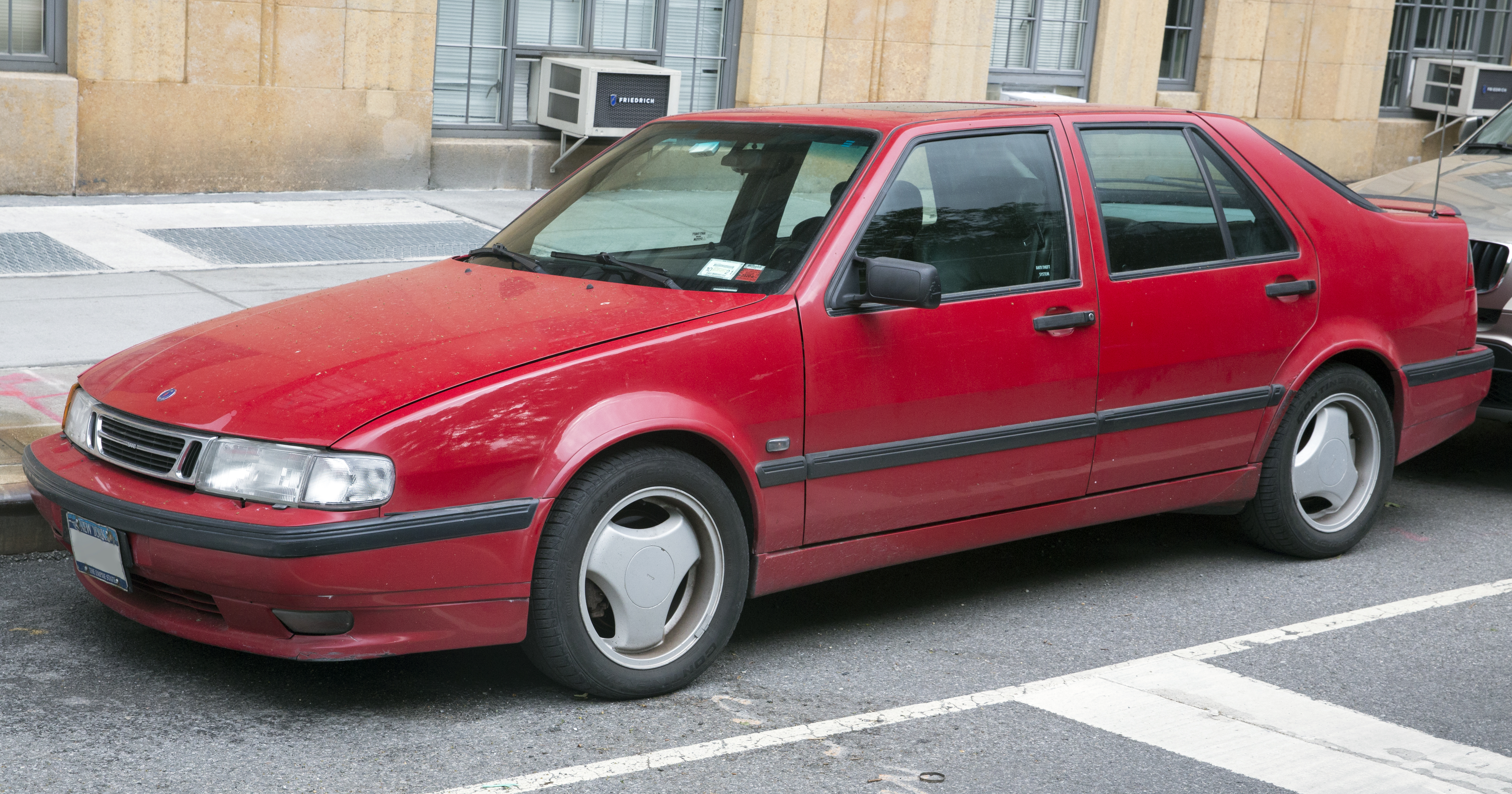
1995 Saab 9000 CS Aero (US)

After the old B202 engine was phased out after 1993, there were in summary 8 different engine versions for the 9000 available in the upcoming years, but not all engines were offered in all markets. For an example, the B204 FPT (Full Pressure Turbo) with 185 hp was the top-of-the-range engine in some European countries where 2.3-litre engines were not offered for tax reasons. Conversely, this engine was not offered in other important markets, such as Germany or the USA. After the 1995 model year, the naturally aspirated four-cylinder engines were discontinued in the United States.

A limited-edition Anniversary model was introduced in 1997 to mark Saab's 50th anniversary, featuring leather seats embossed with the classic, aircraft-inspired Saab logo and a colour-keyed body kit. The engine type was freely selectable from the available turbocharged engines from the 1997 model year except the engine used in the Aero model. The "Anniversary" could be ordered until the end of the 9000's production in 1998. During 1998, the "Anniversary" could be also ordered with the engine of the Aero model.

The Saab 9000 CS Aero was introduced in 1993. Unveiled at the Paris Motor Show in October 1992, the new 9000 Aero was the fastest Saab automobile to date. Models with manual transmission were powered by a 225 PS (165 kW) version of Saab's 2.3-litre B234 engine, with more power courtesy of a larger Mitsubishi TD04 turbocharger. Models equipped with the automatic transmission were limited to 200 PS (147 kW) and kept the regular turbocharged models' Garrett T25 turbocharger. However, in markets with a ‘penalty tax’ for engines with a displacement of more than 2 litres, such as Italy, the Aero was only offered with the B202 FPT engine (185 hp).

The Aero was equipped with a paint-matched body kit and spoiler, eight-way Recaro-designed heated sports seats, a sport suspension, and 16-inch three-spoke Super Aero wheels. The Aero's in-gear acceleration was strongly emphasised; Hemmings wrote, "The 5-speed Saab 9000 Aero will streak from 50 to 75 mph faster than a Ferrari Testarossa or a Porsche Carrera 4." The Aero was discontinued in 1997 and its engine became available for all 9000 models for 1998. Total production numbers of the 9000 CS amounted to 174,525 units (34.7% of overall production).

== One-offs ==
=== Convertible (prototype) ===
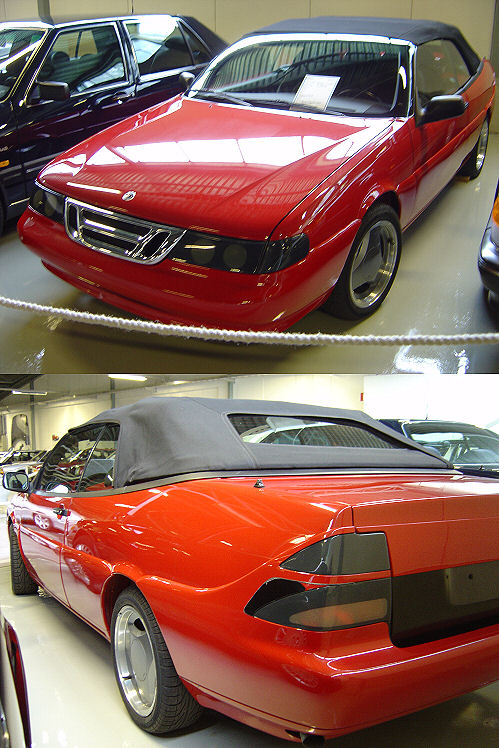
Convertible prototype

A convertible version was constructed by Finnish company Valmet, the prototype version is currently on display at the Uusikaupunki car museum near the Valmet factory. Other experiments included fitting of the Yamaha developed Ford SHO V6 engine most famously fitted to the Ford Taurus SHO. This was vetoed by Saab-Scania, Saab's owner at the time, as was the fitting of a VM Motori diesel engine which had been executed with the goal to increase Saab's sales in central and southern Europe.

=== Prometheus (prototype) ===
In 1993, Saab experimented with steer-by-wire technology as part of the pan-European programme "Prometheus" (Programme for European Traffic with Highest Efficiency and Unprecedented Safety). Their contribution to the programme consisted of a modified 9000 with the steering wheel replaced with a center-mounted joystick. This setup removed the risk of body and facial injury in the event of an accident. It also provided easier and cheaper airbag installation, as well as improved instrument panel visibility. This prototype was tested by Jeremy Clarkson in an episode of Top Gear; the segment was revisited in Series 18, Episode 5 of the Top Gear TV series, where Clarkson and James May paid tribute to the fallen automotive marque.

=== MPV (prototype) ===
At a visit to the American Sunroof Company, who helped design the Saab 900 convertible, the engineers spotted the building of a minivan based on the Chrysler's K-car (later launched as Chrysler Voyager). Gunnar Larsson thought it was a neat idea and when he came home he asked the head of bodyworks Dick Ohlsson if they could do something like that based on the Saab 9000. "No problem", was the reply and a small team started working on it in secret. They used the 9000 platform but lengthened and with higher roof and room for seven persons (even if the rear seat was mostly suitable for children). The full-scale model was finished in May 1985, two months after the idea was first mooted.

=== Saab 9000 Limousine ===
British coachbuilder Coleman & Milne extended several Saab 9000s into stretch limousine versions.

=== Saab 9000 Ecosport ===
The 9000 Ecosport was developed to be introduced at the 1992 Geneva Motor Show. It featured a 280 hp (209 kW; 284 PS) engine and four-wheel drive. Saab had a finished car to show, posters and brochures were printed, but in the last moment General Motors stopped Saab from unveiling the car as they wanted Opel to be the first to present four-wheel drive. Saab had to quickly rebuild it as a front-wheel drive only car. The show car had some innovations like UV headlights and a more eco-friendly engine.

== Engines ==
The Saab 9000 was available with a variety of naturally-aspirated and turbocharged engines. The range consisted mostly of the Saab 2.0 and 2.3 litre engines, but there was also the 3.0-litre V6 made by General Motors. One 9000 was fitted with a prototype Saab V8 engine.

After the facelift in 1992 and as of 1993 (in most markets), the newly introduced two equipment series CS/CD and CSE/CDE could be combined with all available engines (depending on the country) in the respective model years. This means that even a base CS could be ordered with the most powerful turbo engine. The face lifted CS models and the CD were available in MY 1992 in most countries with the same four engines which had also powered the former CC: - the old B202 with and without the turbocharger, both known from the classic Saab 900 - the B234 with and without the turbocharger This changed for MY 1993: on most international markets a 2.0 litre light pressure turbo (LPT) equipped engine called B204 with two balance shafts (like in the B234) became available on both CS and CD models. In these markets, this LPT engine gradually replaced the 2.3 litre naturally aspirated unit. Because Saab did not introduce the 2.0 litre LPT in the U.S., the LPT concept did not enter the U.S. market until 1994 with the 2.3 LPT, based on a re-designed B234 engine. Since then, the Saab 9000 has only been available in the U.S. with the three 2.3 litre turbo engines:

2.3 litre LPT: 170 hp
2.3 litre FPT: 200 hp
2.3 litre Aero: 225 hp

The 9000 with this LPT engine had the best fuel economy of any large car in the U.S. in 1995. The background of the new B204 and re-designed B234 engine was that Saab needed a suitable engine for the upcoming 900 NG. Since Saab was always under high-cost pressure, the new B204 were designed to fit both the new Saab 900/2 and the Saab 9000. So the new B234 without turbochargers and the B204 without turbochargers and as LPT and FPT were all used in both the 9000 and 900 NG. There were two generations of the B234 engine in the 9000, one made from 1990-1993 (called "long block") and the other from 1994 to 1998 (called "short block"). The later motors had a revised oil sump system, cylinder-head, timing cover, and different bell housing pattern.

Therefore, over the years three different engine types developed by Saab itself which were available for the 9000: B202/B204/B234 (with the old B202 phased out on all markets from 1994). The B204 and B234 both came with and without the turbochargers which additionally split in so called LPT (low pressure turbo) and FPT (full pressure turbo). Till 1995, the LPT had the designation "Ecopower" on the cylinder head in some markets. From 1996 Saab used this designation "EcoPower" for all turbocharged engines and in general for the Saab turbo concept. Both systems used the same Garrett T25 turbocharger with a base boost pressure of 0.4 bar (6 psi), but the FPT is equipped with a boost control valve that is manipulated by the ECU. This allows the boost pressure to be increased as the ECU sees fit. Maximum stock boost on a full pressure turbo varies from 0.7 to 1.02 bar (10 to 15 psi) depending on the year and transmission. The LPT engines had a fixed lower boost pressure (and no boost pressure gauge in the cockpit).

For 1995 a 210 PS three-litre V6, originating from General Motors and also found on the Opel (and Vauxhall) Omega, was introduced. For MY 1996 the name "Ecopower" was now applied to all turbocharged engines regardless of FPT or LPT variants. The 2.3 litre fuel-injected engine (without turbocharger) was phased out.

Performance
Model	Code	Type	Displacement	Power	Torque	0–100 km/h (0-62 mph) (seconds)	Top speed	Model years	Description
2.0i	B202	I4	1,985 cc	Cat: 125 PS (92 kW; 123 hp) at 5500 rpm w/o cat: 130 PS (96 kW; 128 hp) at 5500 rpm	170 N⋅m (125 lb⋅ft) at 3000 rpm 173 N⋅m (128 lb⋅ft) at 3000 rpm	11.0	190 km/h (118 mph)	1986–1988	always without DI; this engine was also available in the Saab 900
2.0i	B202	I4	1,985 cc	Cat: 128 PS (94 kW; 126 hp) at 5500 rpm w/o cat: 133 PS (98 kW; 131 hp) at 5500 rpm	173 N⋅m (128 lb⋅ft) at 3750 rpm n/a	11.0	190 km/h (118 mph)	1989–1992	always without DI; this engine was also available in the Saab 900
Turbo	B202L	I4	1,985 cc	160 PS (118 kW; 158 hp)	260 N⋅m (192 lb⋅ft)	8.9	210 km/h (130 mph)	1985-1988	catalytic converter, without DI; available till MY 88 in the 9000 CC (also used in the 900 Turbo 16 till the end of production in 1994); an official 175 PS tuning kit consisting of a modified control unit and injection valves was available
Turbo	B202L	I4	1,985 cc	163 PS (120 kW; 161 hp)	265 N⋅m (195 lb⋅ft)	8.9	215 km/h (134 mph)	1989-1992	Catalytic converter, with DI, introduced in the CD in MY 88 and phased out later with the introduction of the B204L; an official tuning kit consisting of a modified control unit and injection valves was available to achieve 175 PS
Turbo	B202L	I4	1,985 cc	175 PS (129 kW; 173 hp)	270 N⋅m (199 lb⋅ft)	8.3	220 km/h (137 mph)	1985-1991	B202L without catalytic converter; not available in the US
Turbo	B202L	I4	1,985 cc	185 PS (136 kW; 182 hp)	273 N⋅m (201 lb⋅ft)	7.6	225 km/h (140 mph)	1988-1991	B202L with & without catalytic converter and equipped with an official tuning kit consisting of a modified control unit and injection valves, installed in some sports models in some markets i.e. "9000 Turbo 16 SE" in Switzerland
Turbo	B202L	I4	1,985 cc	195 PS (143 kW; 192 hp)	290 N⋅m (214 lb⋅ft)	7.6	230 km/h (143 mph)	1988-1990	B202L with catalytic converter and equipped with an official tuning kit consisting of a modified control unit and injection valves, installed in some sports models in some markets f.e. "9000 Turbo 16 S" in Germany; 1991 replaced by the B234L
Turbo	B202XL	I4	1,985 cc	204 PS (150 kW; 201 hp)	290 N⋅m (214 lb⋅ft)	7.0	245 km/h (152 mph)	1989-1990	B202L Turbo without catalytic converter and equipped with an official tuning kit consisting of a modified control unit and injection valves, installed in some sports models in some markets f.e. French SP, UK Carlsson; 1991 replaced by the B234L
2.0i-16	B204i	I4	1,985 cc	130 PS (96 kW; 128 hp)	173 N⋅m (128 lb⋅ft)	11.0 (aut: 14.0)	190 km/h (118 mph)	1994-1996	new engine, called "short block" with balance shafts
2.3i-16	B234i	I4	2,290 cc	150 PS DIN (110 kW; 148 hp) at 6000 rpm 147 PS ECE (108 kW; 145 hp)	212 N⋅m DIN (156 lb⋅ft) at 3800 rpm 207 N⋅m ECE (153 lb⋅ft) at 3800 rpm	10.5 (aut: 12.5)	205 km/h (127 mph)	1990-1993 1994-1995	"long block", always with balance shafts "short block"; always with balance shafts, also available in 900 NG
2.0t	B204E	I4	1,985 cc	150 PS (110 kW; 148 hp)	219 N⋅m (162 lb⋅ft)	...	...	1994-1998	LPT (Low Pressure Turbo), EcoPower, with balance shafts
2.3t	B234E	I4	2,290 cc	170 PS (125 kW; 168 hp)	260 N⋅m (192 lbf⋅ft)	...	...	1994-1998	LPT, EcoPower, with balance shafts
2.3T	B234L	I4	2,290 cc	195–200 PS (143–147 kW; 192–197 hp)	323 N⋅m (238 lb⋅ft)	8.0	230 km/h (143 mph)	1991-1993; 1994-1998	FPT (Full Pressure Turbo) "long block" with balance shafts FPT "short block" with balance shafts
2.3T automatic	B234L	I4	2,290 cc	195 PS (143 kW; 192 hp)	296 N⋅m (218 lb⋅ft)	8.5	225 km/h (140 mph)	1991-1993 1994-1998	same engine as B234L with manual gearing, but automatic comes always with reduced torque from factory; also used in the Aero with B234 automatic
2.3 Turbo	B234R	I4	2,290 cc	220 PS (162 kW; 217 hp)	334 N⋅m (246 lb⋅ft)	7.4	250 km/h (155 mph)	1992-1993	used in Carlsson/Talladega models in MY 92, Aero MY 93, manual transmission only
2.3 Turbo	B234R	I4	2,290 cc	225 PS (165 kW; 222 hp)	342 N⋅m (252 lb⋅ft)	6.7,	250 km/h (155 mph)	1993-1997	manual transmission only; used in the Aero from MY 94 and in the last MY of the 9000
2.0T (Aero)	B204L	I4	1,985 cc	185 PS (136 kW; 182 hp)	263 N⋅m (194 lb⋅ft)			1994-1998	FPT also with automatic, official only available in some countries, where the B234L/R was not offered, f.e. Italy ("Italo Aero"), also available in 900 NG
3.0 V6 (GM)	B308	V6	2,962 cc	210 PS (154 kW; 207 hp)	270 N⋅m (199 lb⋅ft)	8.0	230 km/h (143 mph)	1995-1997	

== Production figures ==
Year	Production
1984	470
1985	13,721
1986	34,816
1987	49,081
1988	52,199
1989	49,556
1990	45,648
1991	45,533
1992	45,906
1993	37,384
1994	32,196
1995	36,844
1996	32,992
1997	24,201
1998	2,540
Total	503,087

== Bibliography ==
- Lund, Eric (January 2009). "Klassiker: Saab 9000 Turbo 16" (PDF). Automobil (in Swedish). Stockholm, Sweden. Archived (PDF) from the original on 6 March 2016.
