= Saab 900 =

Swedish executive car

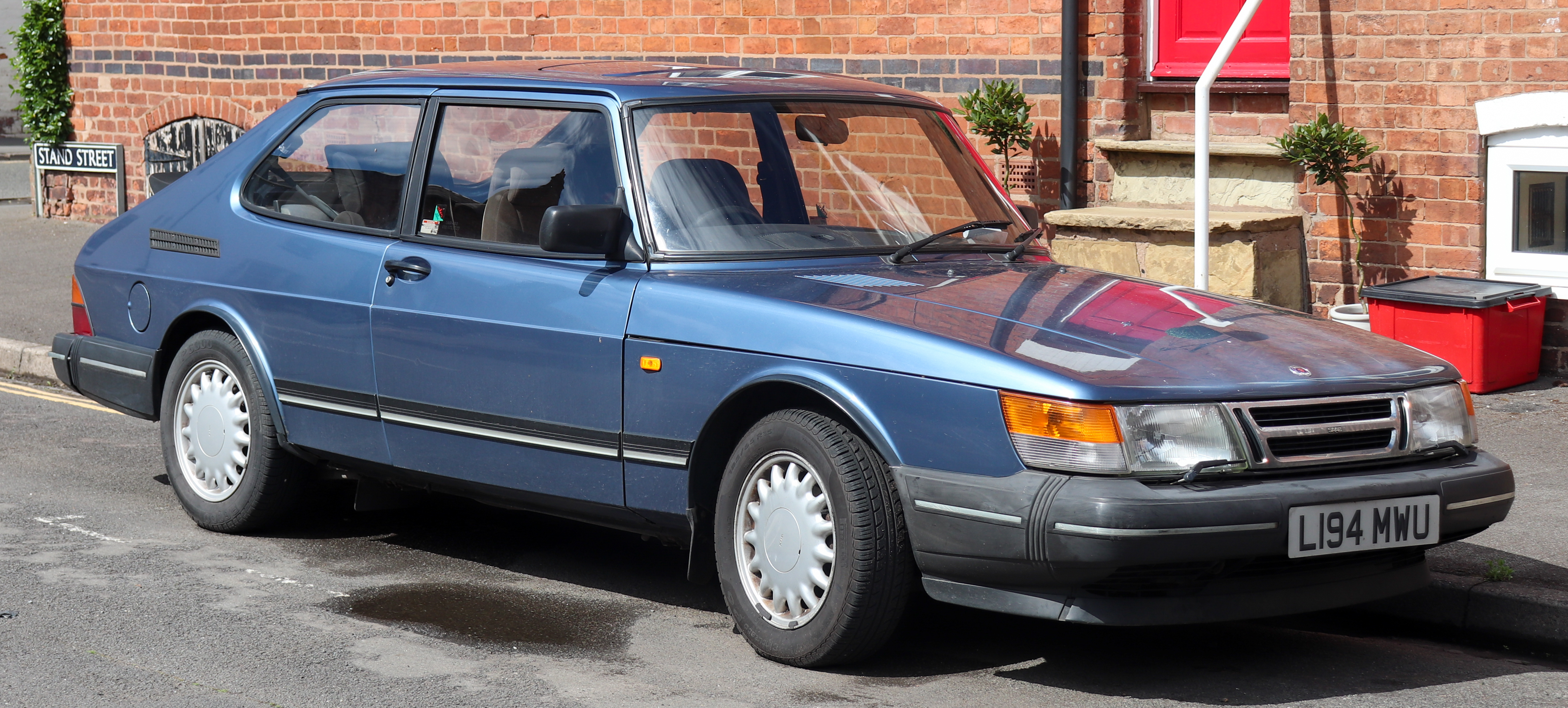
- 1993 Saab 900 SE Turbo

Overview
- Manufacturer: Saab-Scania (1978–1990); Saab Automobile (1990–1997)
- Production: May 1978–1997
- Assembly: Sweden: Trollhättan (until 1997); Arlöv (until 1989); Malmö (1989–1991); Finland: Uusikaupunki (Saab-Valmet)

Body and chassis
- Layout: Front-engine, front-wheel-drive

Chronology
- Predecessor: Saab 99
- Successor: Saab 9-3

The Saab 900 is a compact car (first series) respectively mid-sized (second series) automobile produced by Swedish manufacturer Saab from 1978 until 1997 in two generations: the first from 1978 to 1993, and the second from 1993 to 1997.

== Saab 900 "Classic" (1978–1993) ==
Saab 900 "Classic"
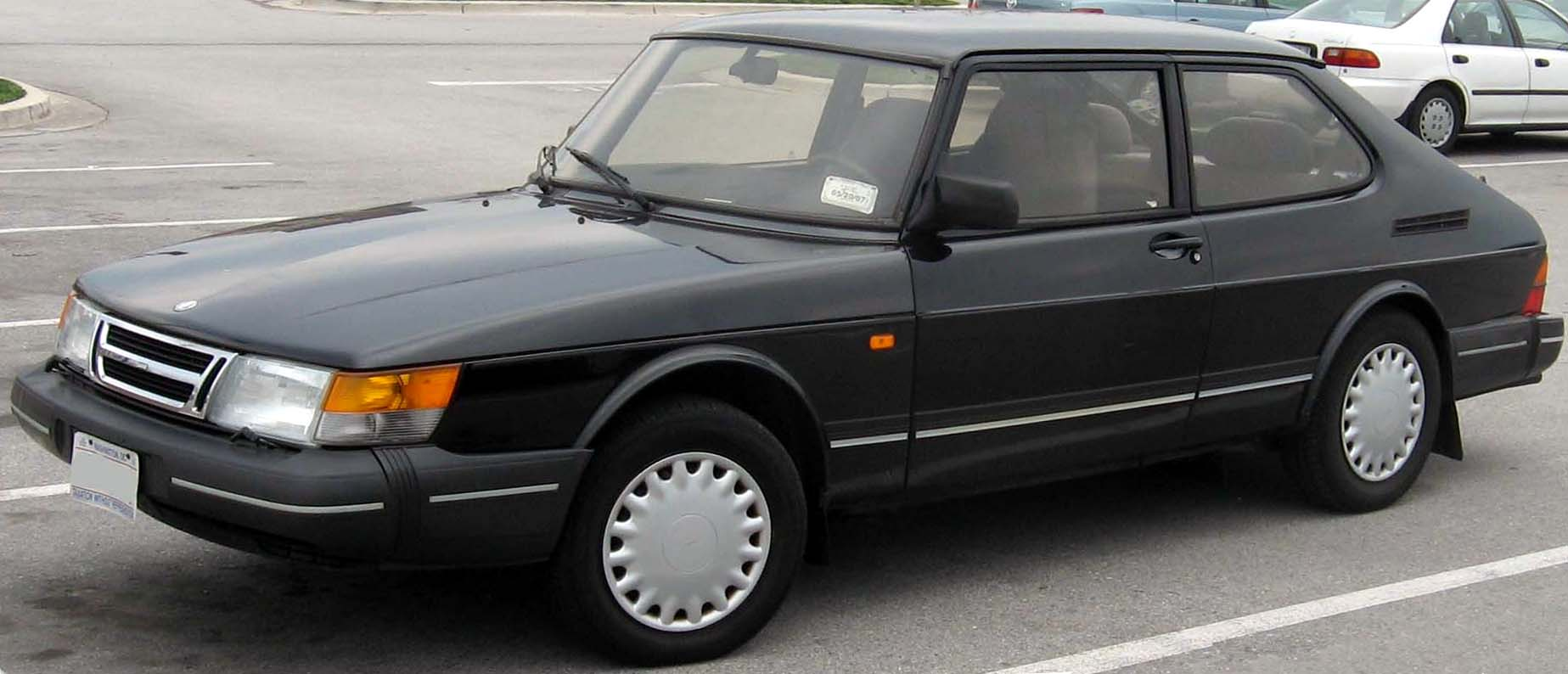
- Saab 900 3-door hatchback (facelift model)

Overview
- Manufacturer: Saab Automobile
- Production: 1978–1993
- Designer: Björn Envall

Body and chassis
- Body style: 2-door convertible; 2/4-door saloon; 3/5-door hatchback

Powertrain
- Engine: 2.0 L Saab B I4; 2.0 L Saab B201 I4; 2.0 L Saab B202 I4; 2.1 L Saab B212 I4
- Transmission: 4/5-speed manual; 3-speed Borg-Warner T-37 automatic

Dimensions
- Wheelbase: 2,517 mm (99.1 in)
- Length: 4,685 mm (184.4 in); 4,680 mm (184.3 in) (S & Turbo); 4,940 mm (194.5 in) (CD)
- Width: 1,690 mm (66.5 in)
- Height: 1,425 mm (56.1 in); 1,400 mm (55.1 in) (Turbo)

Chronology
- Predecessor: Saab 99
- Successor: Saab 900 (NG)

The first-generation car was based on the Saab 99 chassis, though with a longer front end to meet upcoming U.S. frontal crash regulations and to make room for the turbo-charged engines, air conditioning and other equipment that was not available in the early days of the 99 model. The 900 was produced in two- and four-door sedan, and three- and five-door hatchback configurations and, from 1986, as a cabriolet (convertible) model. There were single– and twin–Zenith-carburettor, fuel injected, and turbocharged engines, including full-pressure turbos (FPT) and, in European models during the early 1990s, low-pressure turbos (LPT).

The 900 was originally introduced on 12 May 1978, for the 1979 model year. Sales commenced in the fall of 1978. It has a longitudinally mounted, 45-degree canted, inline four-cylinder engine, double wishbone front suspension and beam-axle rear suspension.

Like its predecessor, the 900 contained a number of unusual design features that distinguish it from most other cars. First, the B engine was installed "backwards", with power delivered from the crank at the front of the car. Second, the transmission, technically a transaxle, bolted directly to the bottom of the engine to form the oil pan (albeit with separate oil lubrication). Thus, power from the crank would be delivered out of the engine at the front, then transferred down and back to the transmission below, via a set of chain-driven primary gears.

The body of the 900 CC (Combi Coupé) was developed from the older 99 model, keeping the basic layout but with a new longer front-end. This allowed for more space in the engine bay and better crash protection for passengers. The middle and rear parts of the body were in the first years identical to those of the 99 Combi Coupé (which was withdrawn from the lineup at the same time). Later, the rear end underwent minor changes (the tailgates of a 99 CC and a 900 CC are not interchangeable); among other things, the lights were moved to the tailgate. A new rear end was designed for the two-door and four-door sedans which was also used for the convertible. In the early 1980s, most 900s were produced in Trollhättan. However, coinciding with the introduction of the 9000, most of the 900's production took place elsewhere. The Valmet plant in Finland produced the base models of the 900, a total of 238,898 examples. The plant in Arlöv, near Malmö, also produced the Saab 900.

Refined over several decades of two-digit Saab models, the 900's double wishbone suspension design provided excellent handling and road feel. The rear suspension comprised a typical beam axle design, stabilized with a Panhard rod. However, the attachment points between the axle and chassis made up an unusual configuration that, in essence, consists of two Watt's linkages at either end of the axle: A lower control arm attaches the axle to the bottom of the vehicle, while an upper link attaches at the top but faces towards the rear, unlike a typical four-link design with both lower and upper links facing forward. The design principle being similar with the rear suspension presented in Alfa Romeo Alfasud already in 1971, except in the Alfasud, the beam axle itself functioned as a sway bar, hence separate sway bars in the rear suspension were not needed.

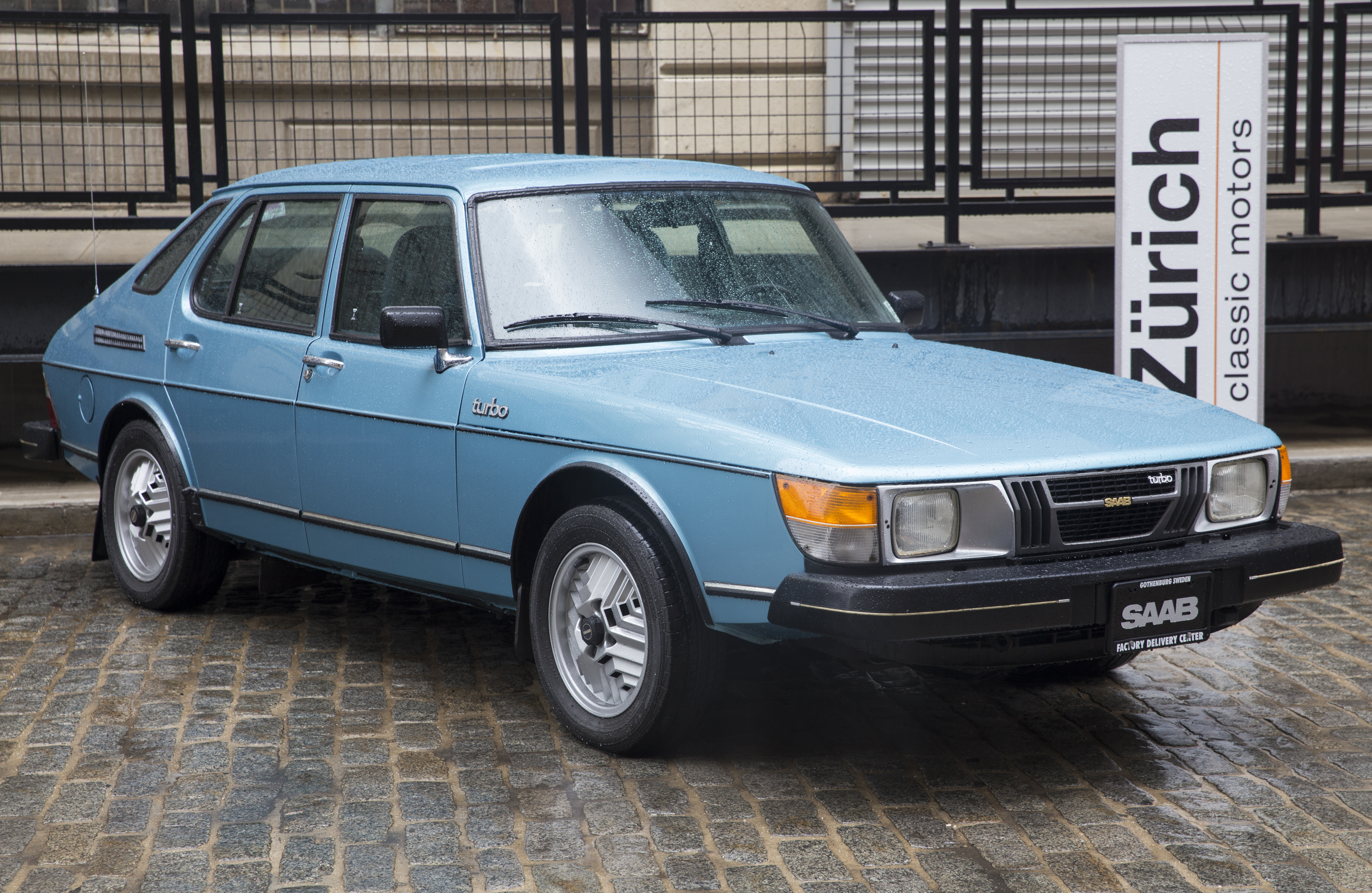
1979 five-door hatchback (US market Turbo, pre-facelift)

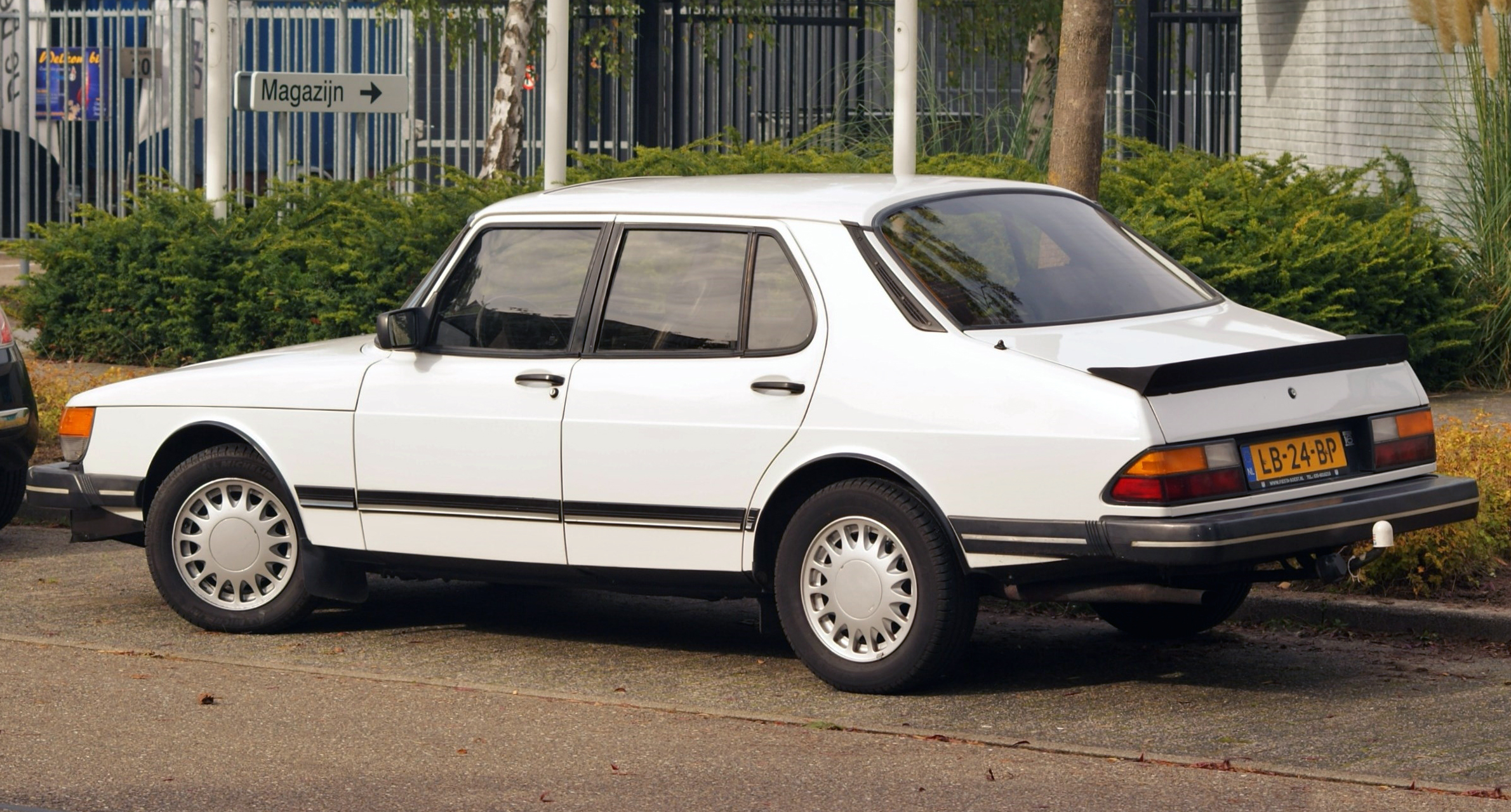
1984 Turbo 16 Sedan (pre-facelift)

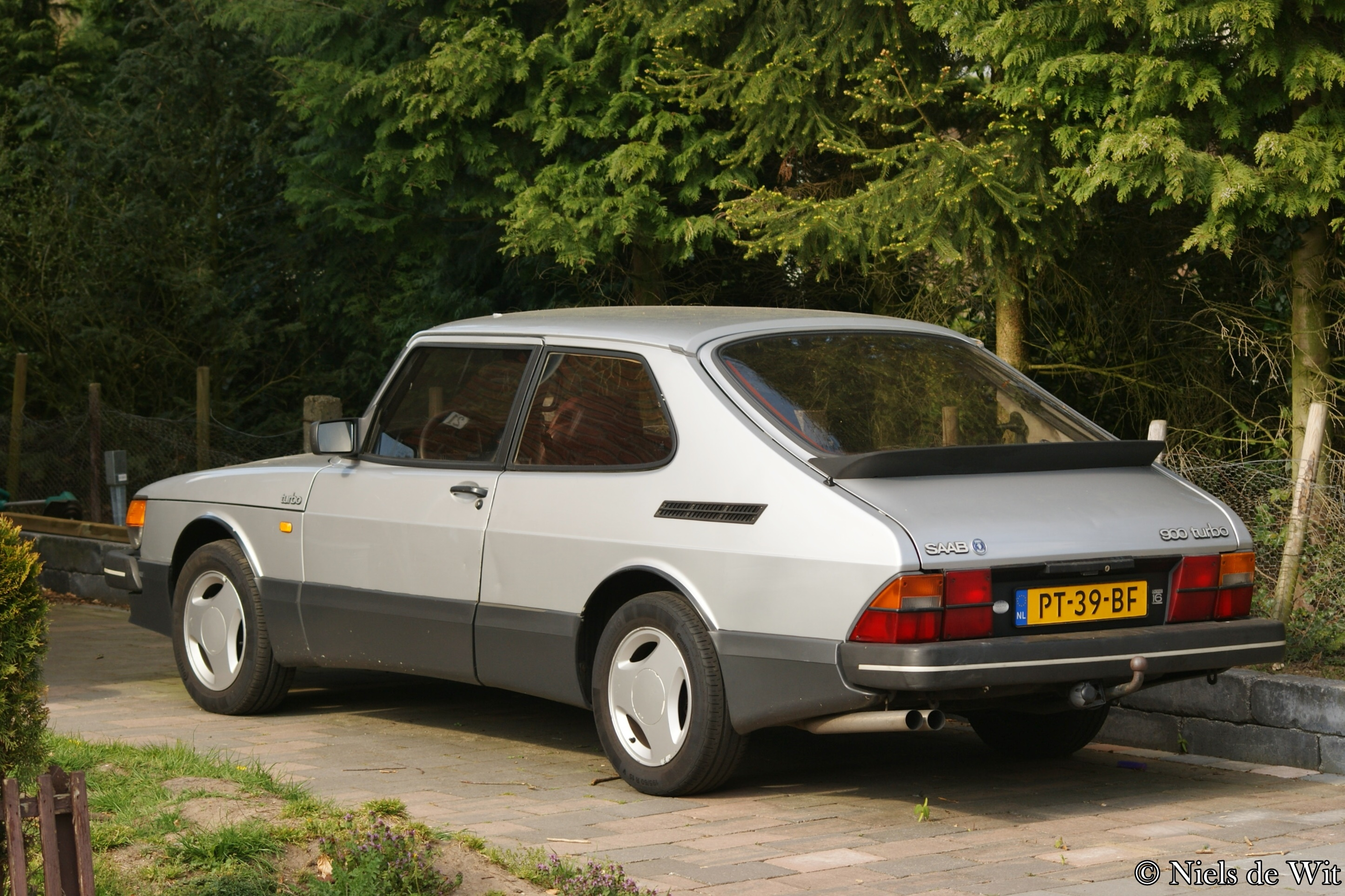
1986 three-door hatchback (pre-facelift)

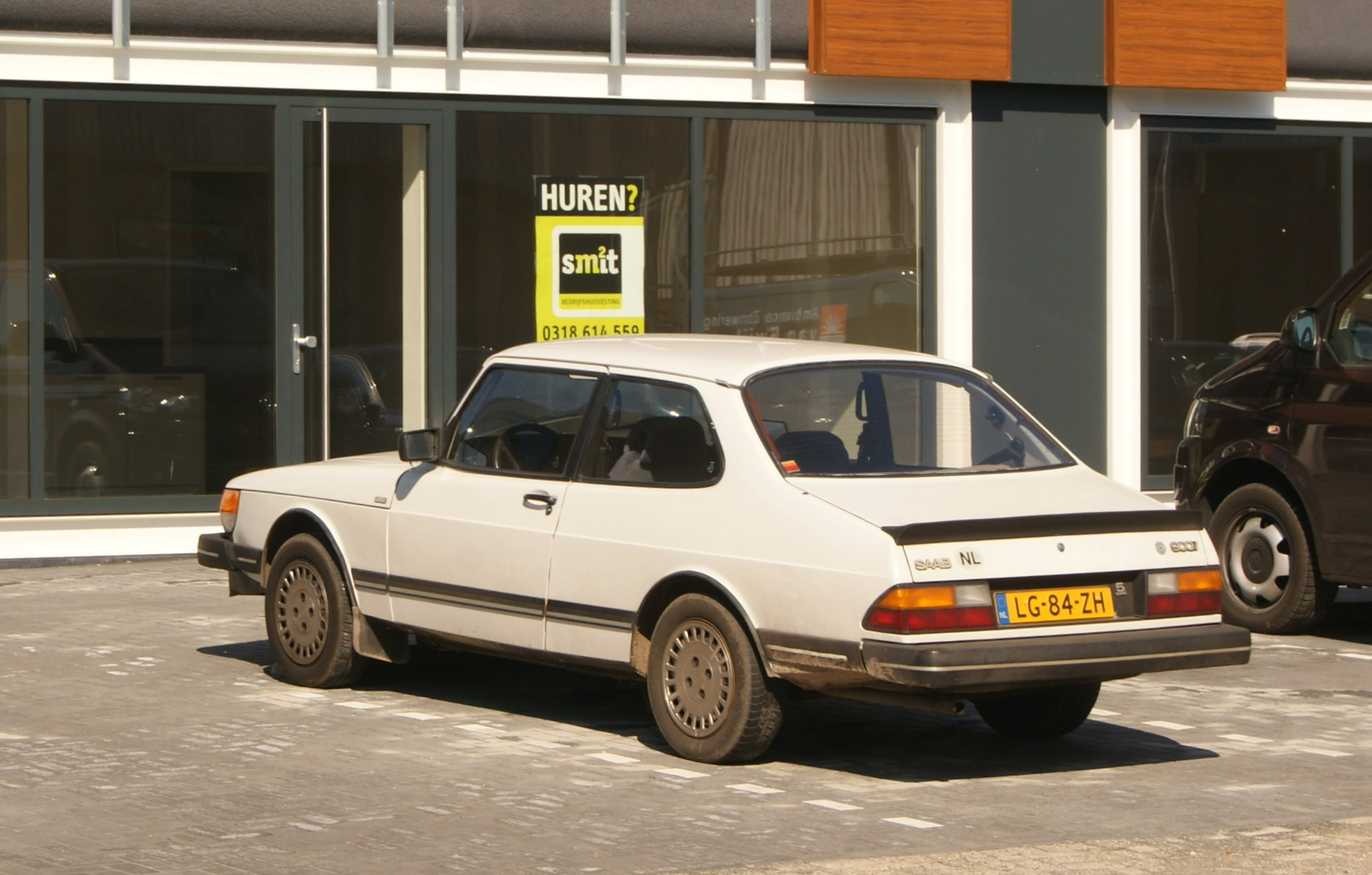
1984 two-door sedan (pre-facelift)

The 900 has a deeply curved windshield, improving driver visibility. The dashboard is also curved to enable easy reach of all controls, and featured gauges lit up from the front. Saab engineers placed all controls and gauges in the dashboard according to their frequency of use and/or importance so that the driver need only divert their gaze from the road for the shortest possible time and by the smallest angle. This is why, for example, the often-used radio is placed so high in the dashboard. In keeping with the paradigm of its predecessor, the 99 model, the 900 employed a door design unique in automotive manufacturing, with an undercutting sweep to meet the undercarriage, forming a tight, solid unit when the door was closed. This feature also eliminated the stoop in the cabin at the footing of the door, as seen in automobiles of other manufacturers, thereby preventing water and debris from collecting and possibly entering the cabin or initiating corrosion, as well as enabling passengers to enter and exit the cabin without need to step over several inches of ledge.

The 900 underwent minor cosmetic design changes for 1987, including a restyled front end and bumpers that went from a vertical to a more sloped design. To save money, Saab kept the basic undercarriage more or less unchanged throughout the 900's production run.

The Saab 900 could be ordered with different options, including a high performance option called the Aero or, as it was known in the U.S. "Special Performance Group" (SPG). The Aero/SPG incorporated a body skirt, a sport suspension (that included shorter, stiffer springs, stiffer shocks) and sway bars. The sway bars decrease body roll, but at the expense of some ride comfort and when driven aggressively, increase inside wheel spin. With MY 1987 also the standard 900 turbos got sway bars. All models can be retrofitted with this feature.

The trim levels varied by model year and market. Typically, features that were standard on U.S. models were available as optional extras in Europe (e.g., leather seats, premium stereo and air conditioning). Each of these features could also be ordered independently from Saab's Accessories Catalog for fitment to standard models.

A special UK option at this time was the fitment of Minilite alloy wheels. Initially these had the words 'Minilite' and 'Saab' cast in raised lettering; later cars had similar wheel made by Ronal.

=== History ===
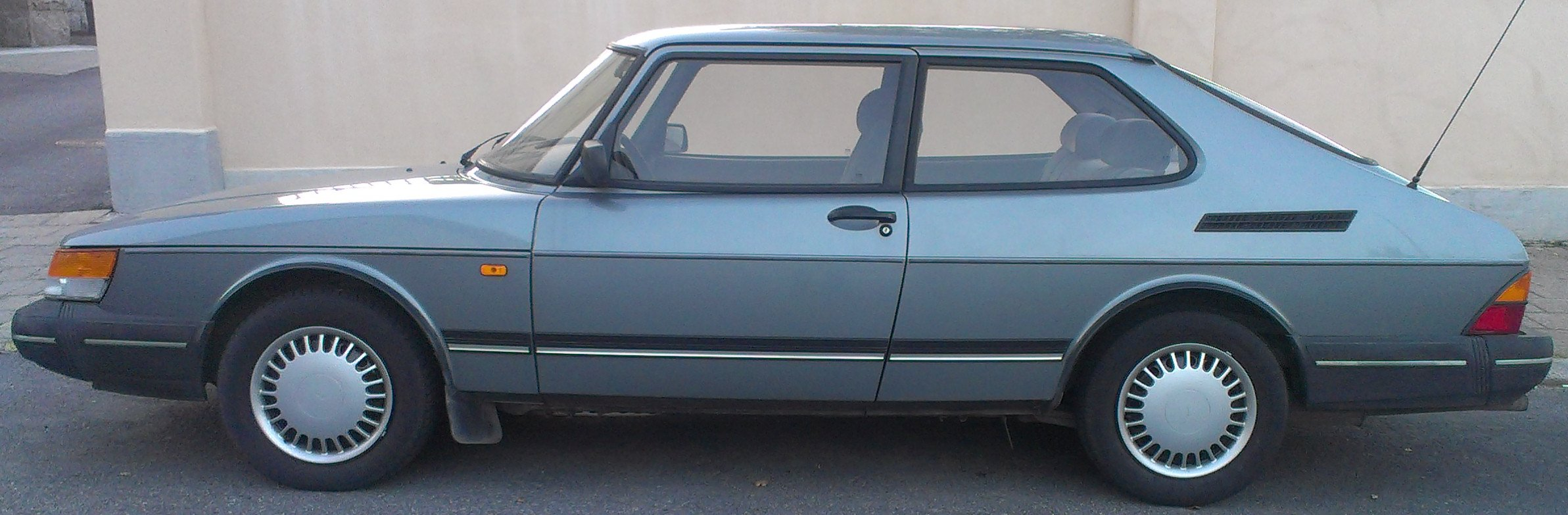
The typical Saab windshield shape is visible.

The 900 in 1978 as MY 79 (Saab's model years were generally introduced in August/September of the preceding year) was available in three versions of the B-engine in the European market: The GL had the single-carb 100 PS (73.5 kW) engine, the GLs had twin carburettors rated at 108 PS (79 kW), the EMS and GLE had Bosch jetronic fuel injection rated 118 PS (87 kW), and the 900 Turbo was rated at 145 PS (107 kW). The Turbo had a different grille from the naturally aspirated models, which received a design with a hexagonal central element. The only bodywork originally available was the three or five-door hatchback, which was seen as more modern at the time. The EMS was only available with three doors while the automatic-equipped GLE was only offered with five.

In the most important foreign market, the USA, the model (and engine) range was different, mainly due to the omission of carburettor engines due to the stricter emissions regulations in force. The Saab 900 was introduced only with two engines: the fuel injected version of 115 hp (86 kW), producing 110 hp (82 kW) in Western and Rocky Mountain states, and the Turbo with 135 hp (101 kW). Engine performance was lower than in other markets due to emissions regulations. The body shapes included three-door GLi, EMS and 900 Turbo variants, along with the 900 GLE and Turbo five-doors. An optional automatic transmission was available on all models except the Turbos.

For the 1980 model year, all versions in all markets received the sleeker turbo-style grille. The 900 also received larger taillights rather than the earlier units shared with the 99, as well as lower, adjustable head restraints. 1980 was also the first year for a five-speed gearbox, originally only available in the EMS and the Turbo. By 1980 in the US, all naturally-aspirated models were now powered by the 110 hp (82 kW), "Lambda" emission control engine which required unleaded fuel only. 1980 was also the last model year for the Saab 99 in the US market.

First shown during the 1980 Geneva Motor Show, Saab introduced for the 1981 model year a new body style: a four-door sedan. With the introduction of the new four-door sedan, the country importers finally decided which models and in which forms they wanted to offer the 900 in their respective markets. So not all engine and body variants were offered in every country. A policy that Saab maintained in the following years and makes generalization impossible. The information here on individual models and engines depending on the model year is therefore only indicative. While the new body shape complemented the model range in all markets, it replaced the five-door variant in the U.S. The introduction went along with a considerable boost in equipment (except the base model "GL") as well as broader side trims, larger luggage compartments and fuel tanks on all models. Another big change: the spare tyre was moved to underneath the floor, rather than standing upright in the luggage compartment (this was the case again with the later introduced convertible).

With the introduction of the new four-door body type for 1981, Saab simplified the model designation on the international markets (with the exception of the US): GL for the model with the single carburettor (with three, four, or five doors), GLs for the models with the twin carburettor engine (also with three, four, or five doors), GLi as designation for the models with fuel injection (with three or four doors), and the GLE was now offered as a better equipped GLi only as four-door Sedan. Top of the range was the "Turbo" with the corresponding engine (with three, four, or five doors). The EMS designation was dropped. In the USA the simplification went even further: "900" for the base model with the 110 hp (81 kW) eight-valve mechanical Bosch injection engine, "900 S" with the same engine, but better equipment, and "900 TURBO" with the eight-valve Turbo 135 PS (100 kW) engine. Since 1980 engines in the US were always equipped with catalytic converters. All models were available only as three- or four-door type.

Also a big change underneath the bonnet for 1981 was the evolution of the old "B engine" to the new "H engine" (which was retained until the end of the 900 series in 1994). The H engine was simplified compared to the old engine design, making it more robust and lighter and, according to Saab, should also reduce fuel consumption. The power output remained the same in all variants as the B engine. Characteristics of the new engine type: no countershaft, ignition distributor driven directly by the camshaft. It is assumed that Saab used up old B engine blocks in the Saab 99, so the new engine layout was not officially introduced in the 99 until the MY 82.

A big change for 1982 was the introduction of Saab's Automatic Performance Control (APC), a.k.a. boost controller for the turbo models. The APC employed a knock sensor, allowing the engine to use different grades of gasoline without engine damage. Another new feature that year was the introduction of central locking doors (on the GLE and Turbo). The long-wheelbase 900 CD was also introduced. Asbestos-free brakes were introduced in 1983, an industry first. The front pads were semi-metallic while the rears were made from silica. The GLE model gained a new central console, while the decor strips on the bumpers of all models were made wider (necessitating wider trim pieces on the flanks as well). A new luxury package was made available on Turbo models.

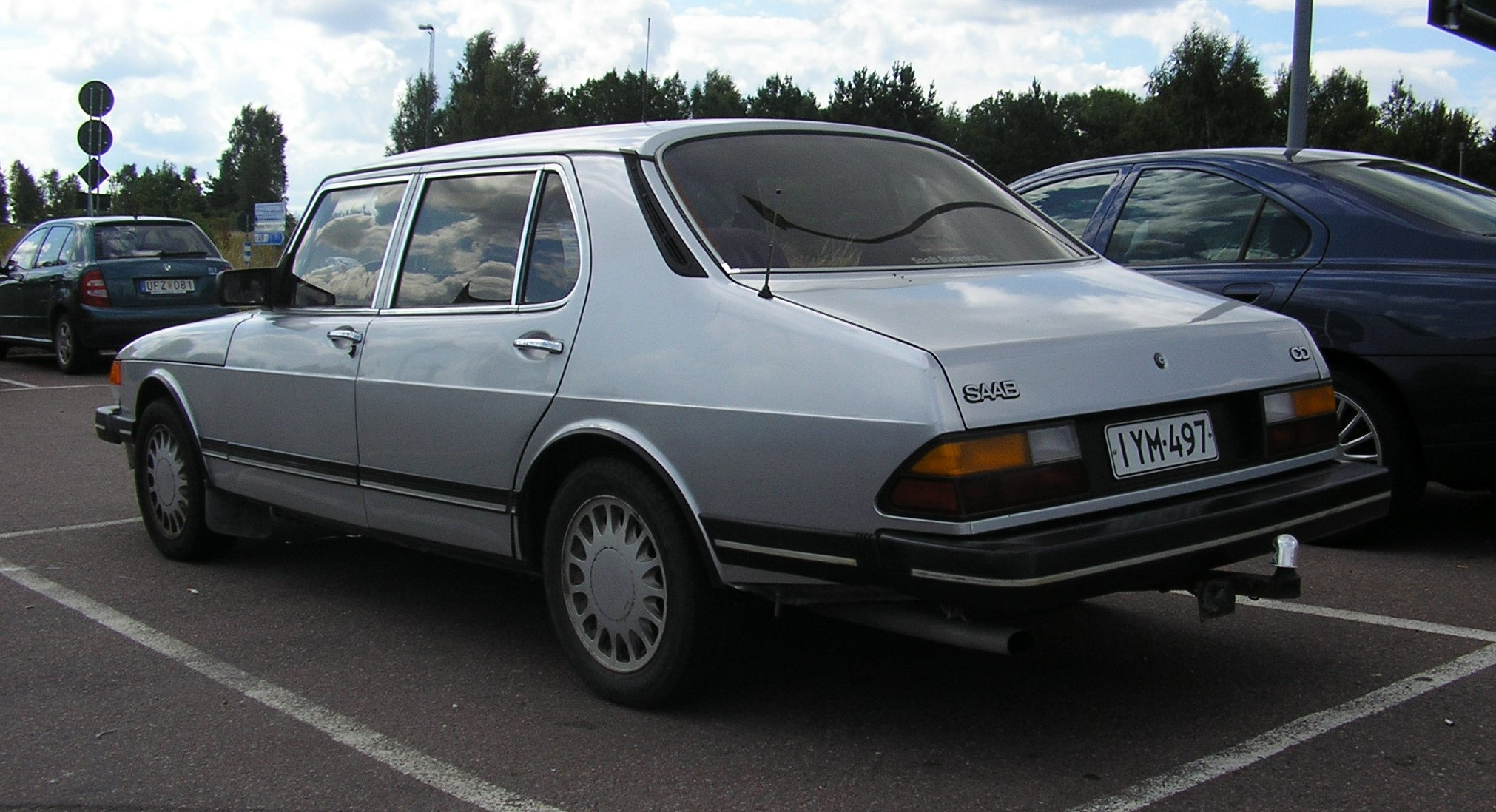
1985 Saab 900 CD, a limited production version with a longer wheelbase and stretched front and rear doors.

The 1984 model year in Europe saw the introduction of the 16-valve DOHC B202 engine (introduced in the US in 1985). With a turbocharger and intercooler, it was rated at 175 PS (129 kW) in the Turbo 16 model (160 PS (118 kW) with cat). The Turbo 16 Aero (designated SPG, Special Performance Group in North American Markets) had a body kit allowing the car to attain speeds up to 210 km/h (130 mph). A different grille and a three-spoke steering wheel appeared across all models. The connection between the side strips and the bumpers was changed, Turbo hatchbacks received a black trim piece between the taillights, and the GLi began replacing the twin-carburetted GLs. At the 1983 Frankfurt Motor Show a two-door sedan was shown; it went on sale in January 1984, initially only as a GLi. The two-door was only ever built at the Valmet plant in Finland.

In the 1985 model year, Saab deleted the two-carburettor engine in all markets and simplified the naming again. The nomenclature GL and GLs was discontinued. The entry-level model with the single carburettor was called simple "900" and the models with the eight-valve injection engine were called "900i". Two turbocharged models were offered: The 900 Turbo had the eight-valve engine, while the Turbo 16 (also Aero) had the 16-valve intercooled unit. Depending on the market, models with the eight-valve Turbo engine were simply called either "900 Turbo". Models with the sixteen-valve turbo engine were called "900 Turbo 16" or (with special equipment) "900 Turbo 16 S" in addition to the Aero and SPG models.

MY 1986 marked the introduction of the 16-valve engine without turbo and the 900 convertible, both only for North America initially, with the 8V engines taken off North American markets by the end of 1985. In Europe the eight-valve turbo received an intercooler for 1986, bringing up power to 155 PS (114 kW) without cat, while the 16-valve turbo cars had hydraulic engine mounts. The eight-valve Turbo was also available as a two-door sedan. Side marker lights at the rear of the front fenders were also added, while the 900i gained new interior fabrics. The new Saab-Scania badge was introduced, placed in the steering wheel, on the bonnet, and on the bootlid. Wheel trims (naturally aspirated cars) and alloys (turbos) were redesigned, and the Turbos also received chromed grilles.

==== 1987 facelift ====
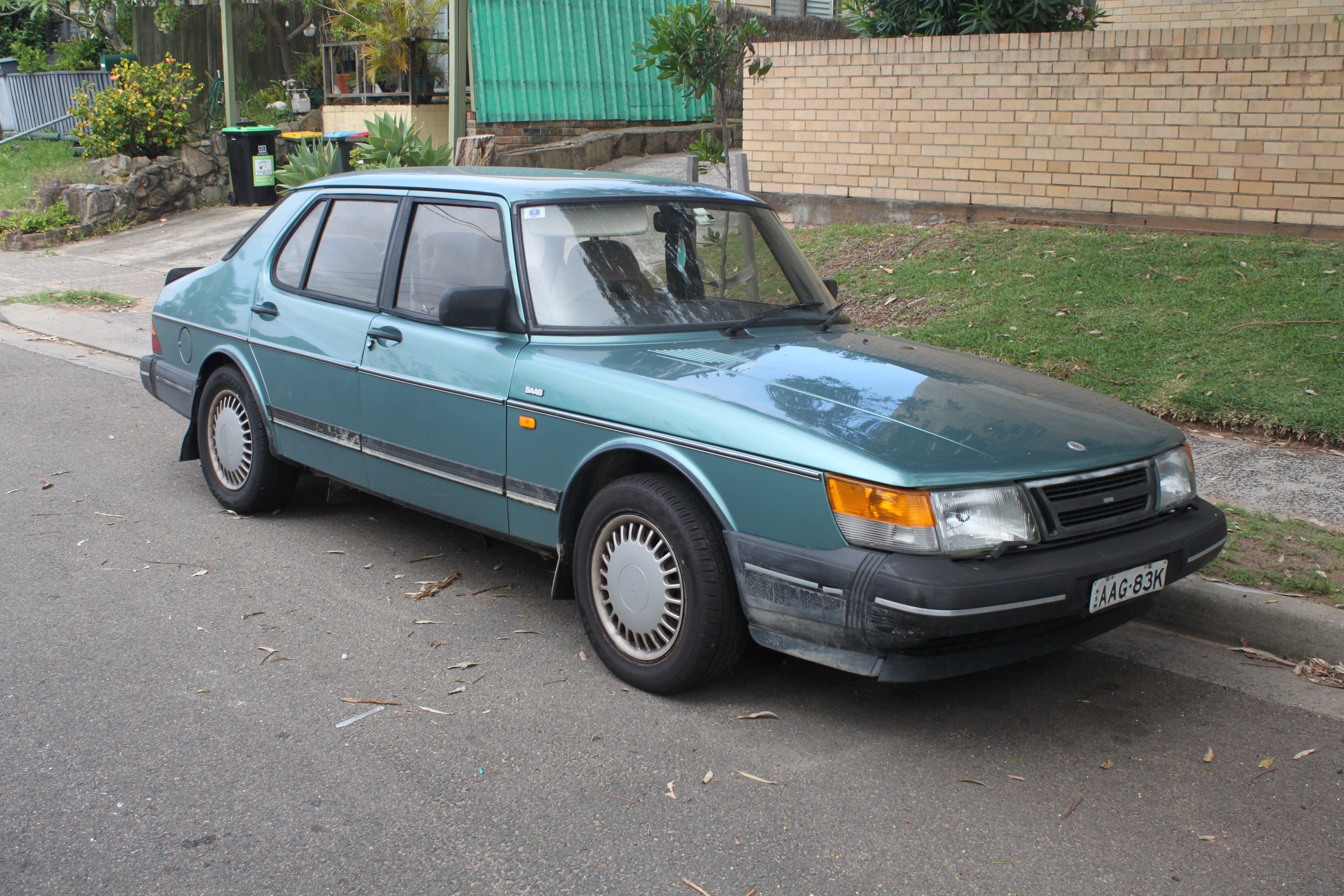
Facelifted Saab 900 sedan with composite headlamps and integrated bumpers (Australia)

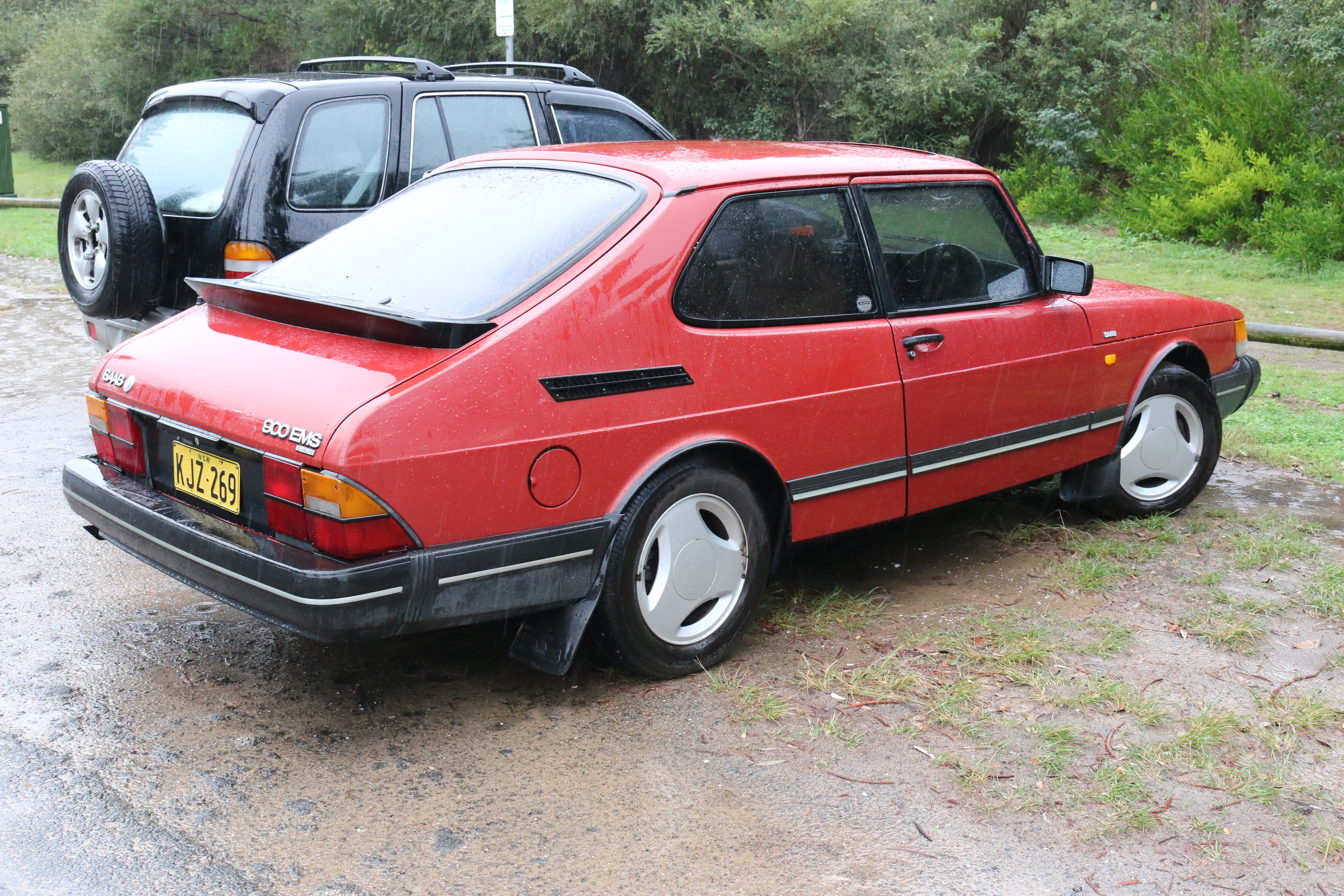
Facelifed Saab 900 three-door hatchback (Australia)

A new grille, headlamps, front turn signal lights and "integrated" bumpers freshened the 900's look for 1987, though the sheetmetal was largely unchanged. Several common parts for the 900 and 9000 were introduced for 1988 model year, including brakes and wheel hubs. This also meant that Saab finally abandoned the use of parking brakes on the front wheels, in favor of the rear wheels. Power steering was added on the 900i. The base 900, available with two or four doors, kept the pre-facelift appearance for 1987. Also new was the carburetted 900c. The Aero model received slightly bigger fender extensions so as to accommodate larger wheels, while the window trim was blacked out on all models. For 1988 catalytic converters became available with all fuel injected engines in Europe, all with cruise control as standard equipment to further help lower emissions. A water- and oil-cooled turbocharger (replacing the older oil-cooled unit) was also introduced to improve the unit's durability.

In each of the seasons 1987 and 1988, there was a special 'one-make' race series, in the UK, called the Saab Turbo Mobil Challenge, sponsored by Saab Great Britain and Mobil. It was run by the BARC.

The eight-valve engines were phased out in all markets for MY 89 and 90. In Europe the eight-valve Turbo dropped out with the 1989 model year, with the limited production 900 T8 Special built to celebrate end of production. 805 were built for Sweden, featuring Aero trim and equipment. The 900i 16 arrived in Europe, with 128 PS (94 kW; 126 hp). Anti-lock brakes were introduced as well, and were standard on Turbo models. High-mounted rear brake lights appeared during 1988, and power of the catalyzed Turbo 16 Aero jumped from 160 to 175 PS (118 to 129 kW; 158 to 173 hp).

Larger pinion bearings were fitted to manual gearboxes for 1989 to improve their strength and reliability. For 1990, the eight-valve engine was taken finally out of production while a low-pressure turbo engine with 141 PS (104 kW; 139 hp) was available in European markets. ABS brakes and driver's side airbags were standardized for all North American market cars beginning with the 1990 model year. In the spring of 1990 the naturally aspirated 900i 16 Cabriolet was added.

A 2.1 L (2,119 cc; 129 cu in) (B212) engine, bored out by 3 mm (0.12 in), was introduced in 1991. This engine was available in the United States until the end of the original 900, but in most of Europe, this engine saw limited availability because of tax regulations in many European countries for engines with a displacement of more than 2000 cc. In Sweden, the 2.1-16 was introduced in late summer 1991 for the 1992 model year and had 140 PS (103 kW) rather than the 128 PS (94 kW) of the 2.0. The 2.1 was made standard fitment on the naturally aspirated Cabriolet, except in markets where the tax structure did not suit it. Front seats from the 9000 were standard from 1991 on and electronically adjustable units were available as an option. Airbags became available as an option in Europe as well, while there was also an Aero trim of the Cabriolet. The 900 no longer offered the mesh wheels. There was also a change in the door locks, which carried over to the 900NG.

For MY 1992 there were mostly equipment adjustments, with ABS brakes finding their way into most of the lineup everywhere. MY 1993 brought no changes, and "classic" 900 production ended on 26 March 1993. The final classic convertibles were still sold as 1994 models. Production of the 900 "classic" totaled 908,817 units, including 48,888 convertibles. Of these, from 1978 to 1992, a total of 238,898 Classic Saab 900 including all covertibles were produced in Finland from Saab Valmet.

Influenced by then owner General Motors (GM), in 1993 Saab introduced the New Generation (NG) 900 SE, based on the Opel Vectra chassis. While this design contained styling cues reminiscent of the classic 900, the 900 (NG) was fundamentally a different car.

=== Convertible ===
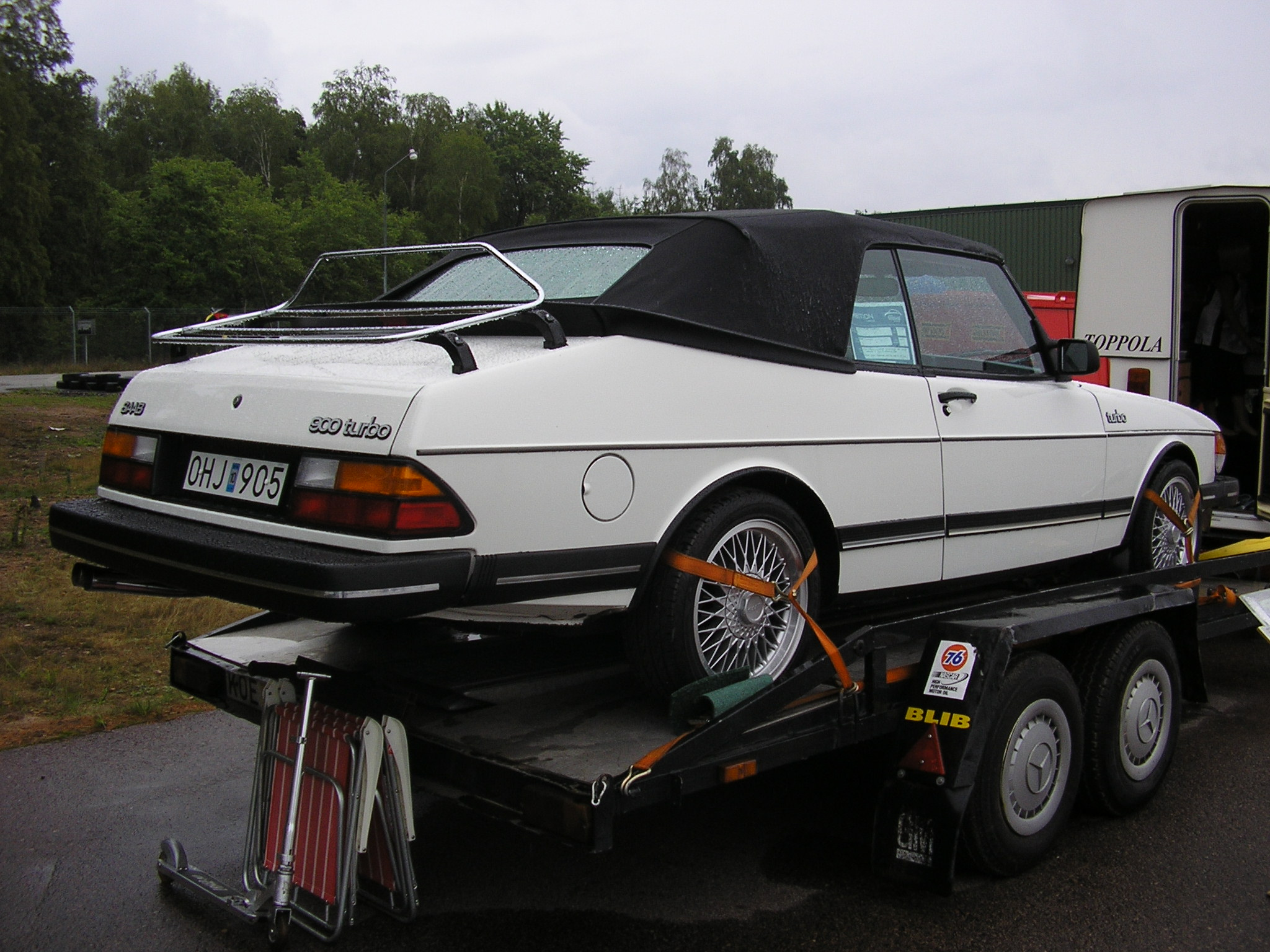
Saab 900 convertible prototype with luggage rack, later available as an accessory

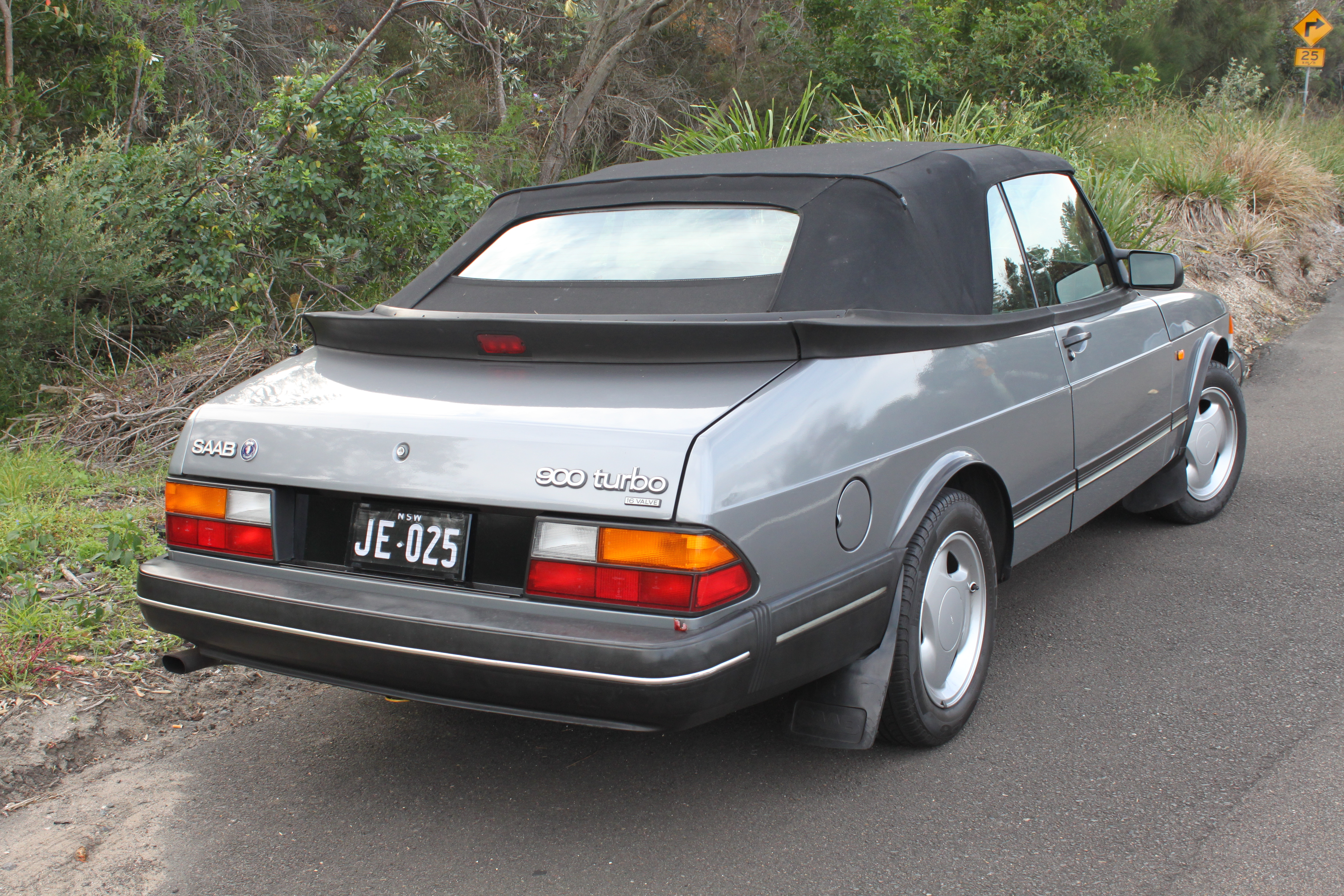
Saab 900 convertible

In the mid-1980s, the president of Saab-Scania of America (U.S. importer owned by Saab AB), Robert J. Sinclair, suggested a convertible version to increase sales. The first prototype was built by ASC, American Sunroof Company (now American Specialty Cars). Similarly, Lynx Motors International Ltd produced two cars, just prior to the official 1986 launch.

The Trollhättan design department, headed by Björn Envall, based its version on the three-door hatchback while the Finnish plant used the sturdier two-door sedan version, with the latter being selected for production as it was deemed more attractive. A limited production run was initially planned but due to the high influx of orders, production was extended.

The new car was shown for the first time at the Frankfurt Motor Show (IAA) in the autumn of 1983. The first prototype generated enormous interest and in April 1984, Saab decided to put the car in production at Valmet Automotive in Finland. The production of the first 900 convertible started during the spring of 1986.

The convertible usually had a 16-valve turbocharged engine, with some trim levels equipped with the intercooler, but it was also offered in certain markets with a fuel-injected 2.1 L naturally aspirated engine from 1991 onwards.

The cabriolet/convertible, was made on the 'classic' chassis for an additional year after the discontinuation of the 900 Classic in 1994.

In US and Canadian markets, commemorative versions were produced for 1994 featuring special charcoal metallic "Nova Black" paint, wooden trim for the dashboard, black leather piping on the seats and higher-performing engines.

=== Engine development ===
Saab introduced a turbocharger in 1978 in its 99 Turbo with the B engine (based on the Triumph Slant-4 engine). This engine was also used in early 900 Turbo models.

For 1981 the B-engine was re-designed as the H engine, which was used through to 1993 (and 1994 cabriolets). Unlike the earlier version, the H-engine is very durable. Saab used Bosch-made mechanical K-Jetronic continuous fuel injection in the fuel injected and eight-valve turbocharged versions, and the Bosch LH 2.2, 2.4 and 2.4.2 and Lucas Automotive electronic fuel injection systems were used in the 16-valve versions. The 2.1 L inline-four 16-valve engine used the Bosch LH 2.4.2 EZK electronic ignition system with a knock sensor. 1981 was also the first year that the Turbo was available with an automatic transmission. The four-speed manual option disappeared after this year.

What set the 900 Turbo apart from its turbo-equipped competitors, especially in the early- and mid-1980s, was the development and use of the Automatic Performance Control (APC) boost controller from 1982. The system allowed the engine to run at the limits of engine knocking. The system had a knock sensor attached to the intake side of the engine block and if knocking of any kind was present, the APC system would decrease the charge pressure by opening a wastegate, a bypass to the exhaust. This enabled the use of various octane fuels and also made the use of the turbocharger safer for the engine. Some 900 Aeros, Carlssons and Commemorative Editions had special APC controllers in red and black enclosures that provided more boost and increased power to 175 hp (130 kW) or 185 hp (138 kW) without a catalytic converter. By 1983, Saab had sold 100,000 turbo-charged cars.

At first, Saab used a Garrett T3 turbocharger, which was oil-cooled. From 1988 through 1990, water-cooled T3s were fitted. In 1990, Saab fitted Mitsubishi TE-05 turbochargers in the SPG models only for the US; for other countries, and for the US from 1991, all 900 Turbos were fitted with the TE-05. Also water-cooled, the TE-05 was slightly smaller than the Garrett T3, providing improved throttle response and quicker spool-up. The TE-05's exhaust inlet flange utilizes a Garrett T3 pattern.

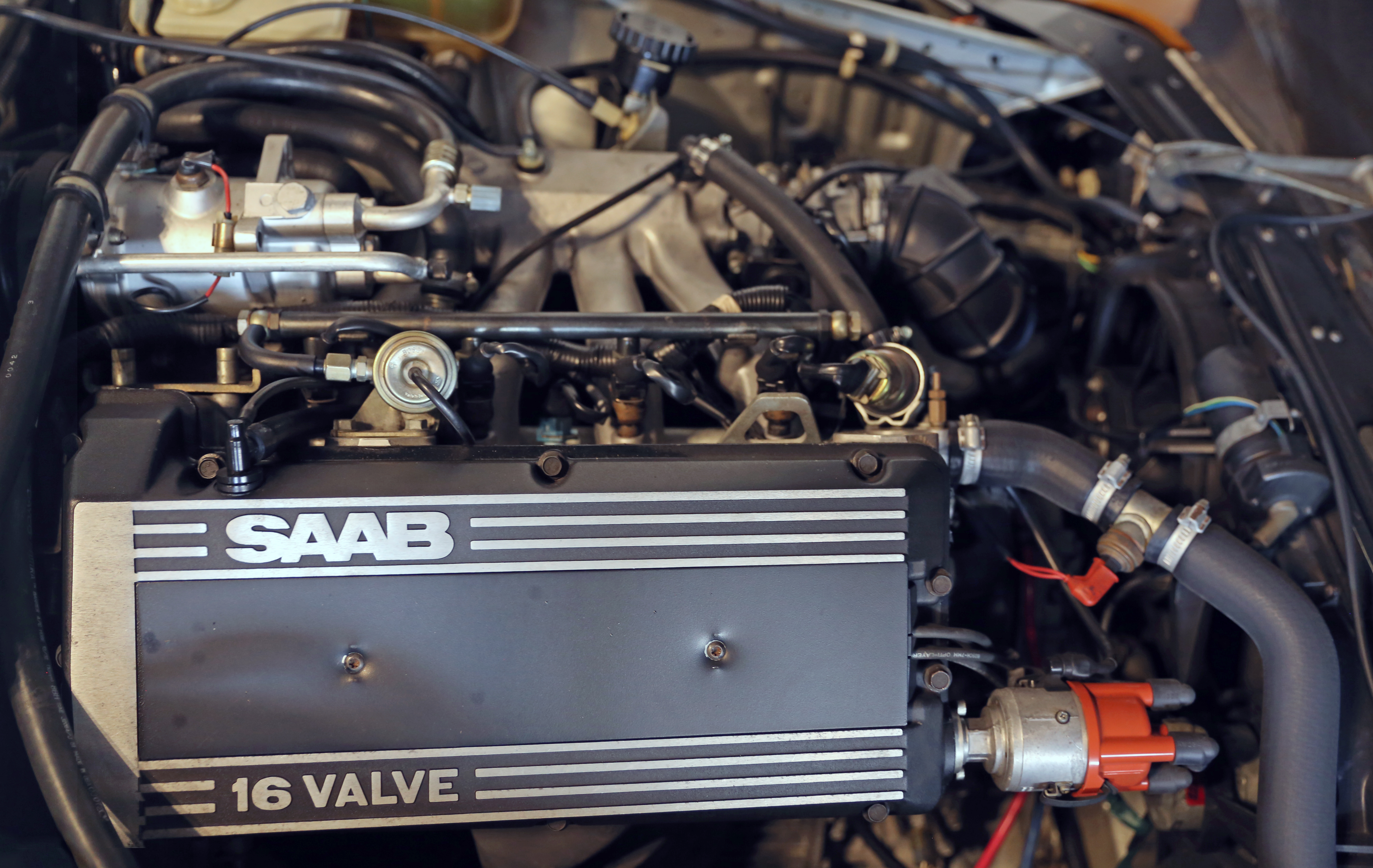
1981–1994 2.0L B202 H engine

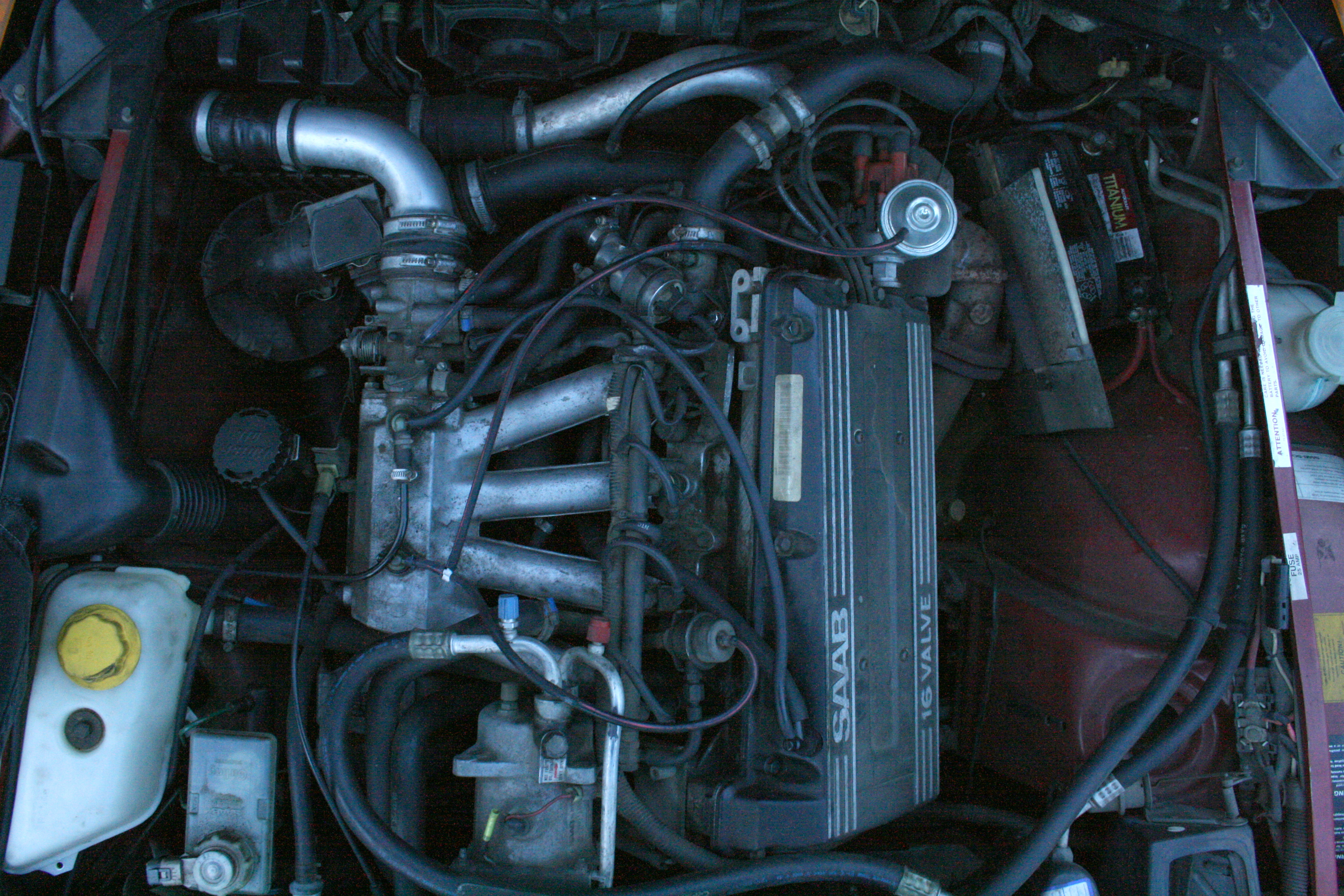
1984–1993 2.0 L B202 T16

=== Engines ===
- 1979–1989: 2.0 L (1,985 cc) B201 NA, single-carb, 101 PS (74 kW; 100 hp) at 5,200 rpm and 162 N⋅m (119 lb⋅ft)
- 1979–1984: 2.0 L (1,985 cc) B201 NA, dual-carb, 108 PS (79 kW; 107 hp) at 5,200 rpm and 165 N⋅m (122 lb⋅ft)
- 1979–1989: 2.0 L (1,985 cc) B201 NA, FI, 118 PS (87 kW; 116 hp) at 5,500 rpm and 167 N⋅m (123 lb⋅ft) at 3700 rpm
- 1979–1985: 2.0 L (1,985 cc) B201 Turbo, 145 PS (107 kW; 143 hp) at 5,000 rpm and 235 N⋅m (173 lb⋅ft)
- 1986–1989: 2.0 L (1,985 cc) B201 Intercooled turbo, 140–155 PS (103–114 kW; 138–153 hp) at 5,000 rpm and 235 N⋅m (173 lb⋅ft)
- 1984–1993: {2.0 L (1,985 cc) B202 16-valve turbo, 160–175 PS (118–129 kW; 158–173 hp) at 5,500 rpm and 255–273 N⋅m (188–201 lb⋅ft)
- 1987–1993: 2.0 L (1,985 cc) B202 16-valve, NA, 126–130 PS (93–96 kW; 124–128 hp) at 6,000 rpm and 170–177 N⋅m (125–131 lb⋅ft)
- 1990–1993: 2.0 L (1,985 cc) B202 16-valve low-pressure turbo (LPT), 145 PS (107 kW; 143 hp) at 5,600 rpm and 202 N⋅m (149 lb⋅ft)
- –1994: 2.0 L (1,985 cc) B202 16-valve intercooled turbo (FPT) in the convertible.
- 1991–1993: 2.1 L (2,119 cc) B212 NA, FI, 140 PS (103 kW; 138 hp) at 6,000 rpm and 230 N⋅m (170 lb⋅ft)

=== Performance ===
- Saab 900i; 118 PS (DIN). Acceleration 0–100 km/h (62 mph) 11.4 sec. Top speed 175 km/h (109 mph).
- Saab 900 Turbo; 145 PS (DIN). Acceleration 0–100 km/h (62 mph) 9.5 sec. Top speed 202 km/h (126 mph).
- Saab 900 Turbo 16 S; 175 PS (DIN). Acceleration 0–100 km/h (62 mph) 8.5 sec. Top speed 217 km/h (135 mph).

=== Special models ===
==== 900 GLi Gold ====
The Gold special edition was available in the UK in 1981 as the first 900 four-door saloons; these had turbo-spec velour interior finished in either blue or black with gold pinstripes, twin air vent bonnet and fuel gauge showing tank contents in litres.

==== 900 Tjugofem ====
The Tjugofem (Twenty-five in Swedish) Saloon introduced to celebrate Saab's 25th year in the UK. Only 300 units were built. These had the 1,985 cc eight-valve engine with Bosch K-Jetronic fuel injection. Interior trim was blue turbo velour with a special gear knob with the car's number. Outside, the model was a standard non-turbo apart from alloy wheels, Tjugofem pinstriping and Turbo style rear spoiler.

==== 900c ====
The 900c was built in Uusikaupunki, Finland and in Arlöv, Sweden just outside Malmö, was a late 1980s carburetted model. It used an eight-valve B201 engine with a single carburettor rated at 100 PS (74 kW; 99 hp) and included power steering as standard equipment.

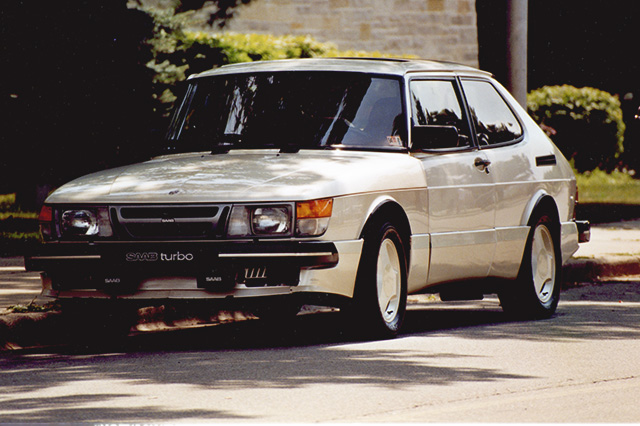
Prototype 900 SPG in Mother of Pearl White. Vehicle shown with US-spec sealed-beam headlamps as originally equipped by Saab for media test drives and reviews.

==== 900 Aero/T16S or 900 SPG ====
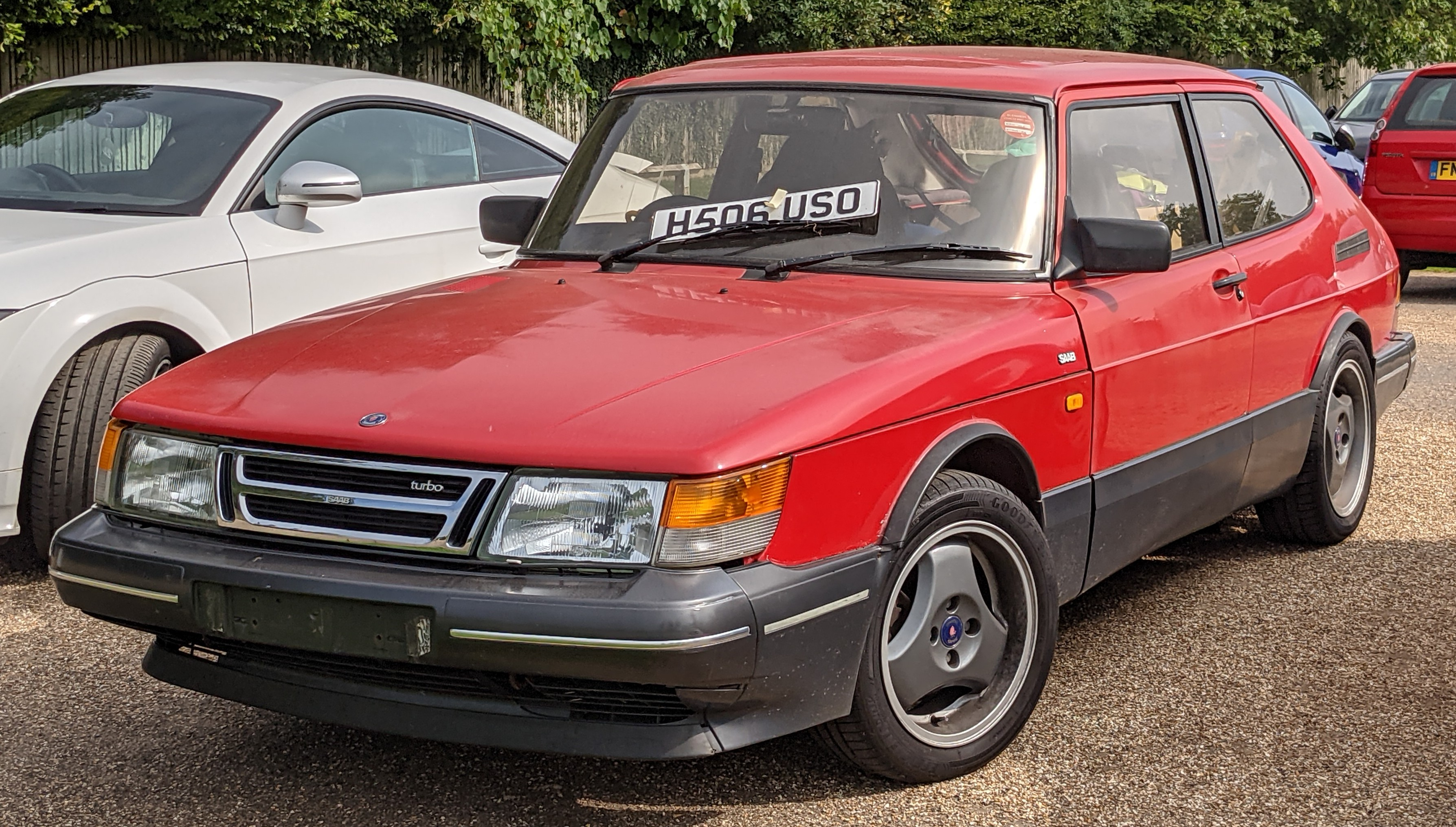
1991 Saab 900 Aero

In 1984, Saab introduced a high-performance model known in Europe as the Aero. In North America, the model designation became SPG (Special Performance Group – per Saab USA's own literature – SAAB data correctly refers to it as Sports PacKage) due to a model and trademark conflict with GM in English speaking countries and the US. In the UK it was known as the T16S. The Aero/SPG was the first Saab to be delivered with the 160 hp (119 kW; 162 PS) 16-valve turbocharged engine.

The most notable difference from the 900 Turbo was the body kit that wrapped around the car and the specialty wheels. The engine was tuned to produce higher output. The SPG also had a lowered and stiffer suspension.

These prototypes were painted a mother of pearl white and had red leather interiors with matching Colorado Red dashboards. Unfortunately, during testing, the colour was found to be too difficult to repair in terms of color, and as such, this color was never offered to the public for sale. Only 29 of these prototype Aero/SPGs were manufactured. The factory retained, and subsequently destroyed, 22 of the white prototypes. The remaining seven vehicles were employed as press vehicles for the series launch.

In 1984, the first year of consumer production, the Aero/SPG was delivered in black and in silver (in markets other than US). In Australia the 1985 models painted in silver colour had a dark red leather interior. In the US, cars painted in black colour were featured tan leather interiors. In Canada and in the rest of the world, the cars were black with red leather interiors. Production of the SPG was extremely limited and paint color availability varied by year. The final year of production was 1991 in the US. In total, over the course of six years, 7,625 SPGs were built and imported to North America. In the rest of the world, Aeros were equally rare – especially those equipped with leather interiors, A/C and other amenities.

==== 900EP (900S) ====
The EP was a special Ecopower model for the Italian market. It uses a 16-valve low-pressure turbo (LPT) engine and has a pre-heated catalytic converter. It was sold outside Italy with a 900S badge.

==== 900 i 16 - 158 HP (900 EIA) in France ====
In 1989, Saab France, in collaboration with the French tuner “E.I.A Moteurs,” offered a special feature: Buyers of a Saab 900 i 16 (non-turbo without a catalytic converter) from model year 89 or 90 were offered a technical performance upgrade for the standard engine, increasing its output from 133 HP to 158 HP. Previous buyers of a Saab 900 i 16 could also have the performance upgrade installed retroactively. Thanks to the performance upgrade and a shorter gear ratio, the “Saab 900 E.I.A.” achieved impressive acceleration figures. The exact number of these performance-enhanced engines produced is unknown. Saab France simply called the model “900 i 16 – 158 HP.” Today, models with these engines are often referred to as “Saab 900 EIA,” even though this designation did not officially exist and it was not a special edition model. It is the only known instance in which a Saab unit officially offered a power upgrade for a non-turbo engine.

==== 900 CD ====
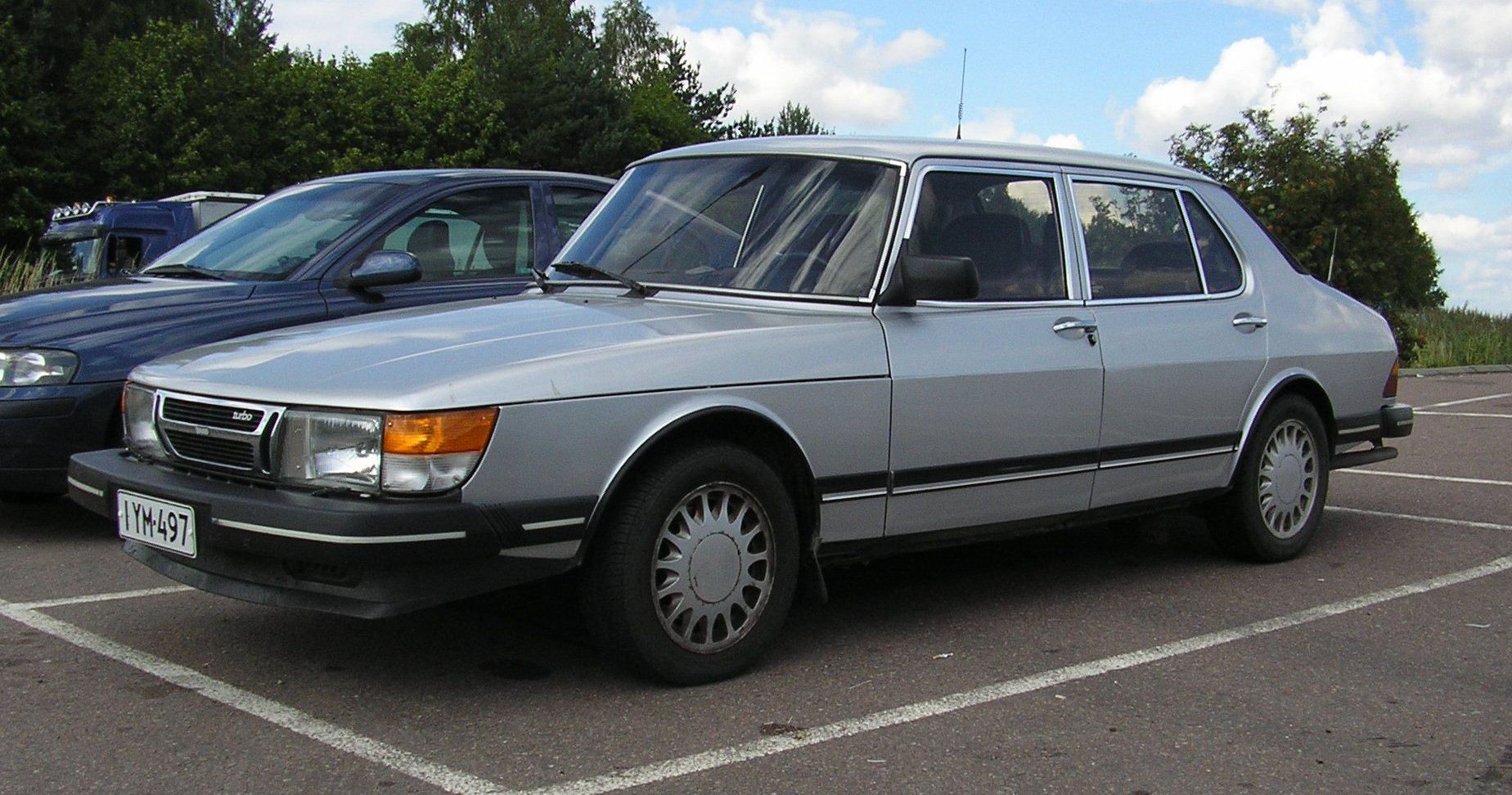
1985 Saab 900CD

In 1977 Saab's Finnish subsidiary Saab-Valmet (Today Valmet Automotive) had created an elongated executive model of the 99 combi coupé named Finlandia. With the introduction of the 900, the concept was transferred onto the new chassis. The Finlandia was 20 cm (7.9 in) longer than standard, by adding 10 cm (3.9 in) to the front and rear doors, but only the rear leg room was larger. The idea behind the car was to produce an executive car which would appeal to the Nordic market as an option to big German and US sedans. The first cars were sold as the Saab 900 Finlandia. These cars made between 1979 and 1982 were combi coupés, and did not have the 'CD' designation. Very few examples of these early models were exported outside of Finland. After the more elegant four-door sedan was introduced, the CD designation replaced the nickname and the Swedish Saab headquarters started to officially offer the car for export. The 900 CD was made at the Valmet Automotive factory in Uusikaupunki, Finland. At least in the domestic market, the cars were essentially built to the buyer’s wishes. The list of optional extras for the CD included a leather interior, reading lights, rear blinds, footrests, and even an in-car telephone. However, due to the cars’ special nature and demanding customer base, the trim and technical specifications of some examples can be unique. The Uusikaupunki factory clearly had high aspirations for the car. Valmet Automotive even developed a prototype of an even longer, seven-seat limousine as a concept car for an official state car. These aspirations were moderately met, although the Finnish government did not actually ever commission Saab to build such a car, the Saab 900CD was favoured as an official executive vehicle by several local municipalities, such as the city of Oulu, and several larger corporations in the wood and paper industry and electronics manufacture industry. It was also used by the Finnish government as the official state car of the Prime Minister during The Second Government of Mauno Koivisto between 1979 and 1982. He was particularly fond of its performance as it was equipped with a turbocharged engine, and he could thus out-run his bodyguards’ Saab 900's which were naturally aspirated. In total, 579 cars were built between 1979 and 1986.

==== 900 Springtime in Sweden (SiS) ====
In 1988, Saab commissioned 288 special models of the 900 convertibles, one for each of its United States dealers, as part of the 1988 Dealer Meeting in Sweden. Dubbed the Springtime in Sweden, or "SiS" model, these cars are differentiated by their Aero/SPG-like bodywork and three-spoke wheels. Each car was painted black, with buffalo grey leather interiors and black convertible roofs. Each car was marked with a special "Springtime in Sweden" emblem that was attached to the lower left of the glove box door. The emblems were all identical and are not serialized. All were Turbo models.

Of the 288 built, approximately 4 were automatics and the remaining 284 had five-speed manual transmissions, per Saab records. Emblems on the exterior body were deleted in the scheme of the SPG, with only the word Saab and the Saab-Scania roundel on the trunk appearing on the car. The car was fitted with the standard Saab grille for the period, but did not feature the miniature "turbo emblem." The SPG suspension was not fitted, and aside from the SPG body fairings and dash emblem, the SiS is identical to a standard 1988 900 Turbo Convertible in the black/gray color combination.

The SiS models were sold, one to each dealer, however some dealers used the opportunity to trade their SiS convertible with other dealers in an effort to get other car models (specifically the 9000CD) for sale. Contrary to popular belief, the SiS was not given to the dealers for free. Dealers paid for their own car, the invoice price even reflected the increased cost of the SPG bodywork. Each dealer did, however, receive an Orrefors crystal vase, engraved with the Saab-Scania logo, packed in the trunk when the SiS was delivered stateside as a surprise gift.

Some individuals, in an attempt to demonstrate the provenance of their vehicles, point to a sticker behind the driver side door card that reads, in part, "AERO" and "CABRIO". This sticker was once affixed to all Saab 900 convertibles and does not designate the vehicle as part of the SiS series. Numerous vehicles are inaccurately listed for sale or referred to as authentic SiS models. There have also been reports of SiS glove box badges being stolen or replicated. One indicator of an authentic SiS is the inclusion of the SiS glove box badge, along with the original window sticker and matching VINs.

==== 900 Enduro ====
The Enduro was a special version of the 1980 900 Turbo assembled by Saab Scania Australia Pty. Ltd.; only eleven 900 Enduros were made along with a full body kit as a spare. Ken Matthews Prestige (a large Sydney-based Saab dealer at the time) were originally commissioned by Saab Australia to oversee the design and implementation of the overall engineering package, with the body modifications themselves designed and built by Purvis Cars of "Eureka" fame.

The package consisted of large fibreglass wheel arches to accommodate the extra track width four inches (100 mm) front and nine inches (230 mm) rear, front air dam and rear fiberglass spoiler fully two inches (51 mm) wider than normal 900 Turbo of that year. Extra gauges (oil pressure, 0–500 kilopascals (0–75 psi), battery voltage, 10 to 16 V, and ammeter, −50 to +50 A) were mounted where the radio usually was. The radio was moved to a new lower centre console that was not fitted to the 1980 model as standard. It was Eurovox MCC-9090R cassette player and radio with Voxson VX-89 graphic equaliser powering six speakers – 2×4" full range front, 2×1" dome tweeter overhead and 2×6" tri-axial rear. Apart from this, the car had a standard turbo version interior with green seats and triangular center steering wheel.

The cars were fitted with either gold or black-centred (depending on body colour) Simmons 'P-4' three-piece composite alloy 7.5×15" wheels with polished lip. The overall outside edge-to-edge distance is four in (100 mm) wider at the front and nine in (230 mm) at the rear over a 900 Turbo of the day – mainly to decrease the roll centre height and improve turn-in response. Tyres were 225/50VR15 Pirelli Cinturato P7 units in the front and rear. Spare wheel was a full size steel rim 5×15" with Michelin 175/70HR15 tyre.

Suspension was improved with 290 mm (free length) by 17 mm 368 lb 7.1-turn springs up front and 300 mm (free length) by 16 mm 484 lb nine-turn springs at the rear. Steering caster was set to +2.25° ± 0.25°, camber to −1.75° ± 0.25° and toe in was 2.5 mm ± 0.5 mm.

To increase performance, the waste gate was set at 17 psi (1.2 bar), which delivered a claimed 175 hp (130 kW) from its eight-valve B201 slant-four engine. Upstream water injection came standard.

Paint was a two-pack Dulux Acran enamel and came in at least four known colours: 137B "Aquamarine Blue Metallic" and a very light green (almost white) referred to as 152G "Marble White". There was at least one Enduro painted in 121B "Solar Red" and a fourth in 148B "Acacia Green Metallic". The hood, side window frames and rear deck were painted in Dulux GT Satin Black. Large "ENDURO" (in 99 TURBO style font) stripes were emblazoned on the hood, the rear deck and along both sides at sill level, although not all vehicles were treated to the "Enduro" hood graphics.

None of the cars are known to be ever exported from Australia, but it's believed that no more than six examples survived to this day, with only three of them actually known. two of those were already extensively modified over the years, one awaiting full restoration. Some of the cars had the wheel centre replaced from Simmons P-4 to deeper dish V-4 version. There is also known a "half-Enduro" car, now owned by a real Enduro owner. The Saab dealer in Adelaide did the same Enduro fiberglass bodykit for their showcar (with a paint scheme of then non-existent 900 Lux) and advertised the conversion option for $5000. This was quickly put to an end as the dealer chose not to risk his dealership agreement with Saab.

==== 900 Lux ====
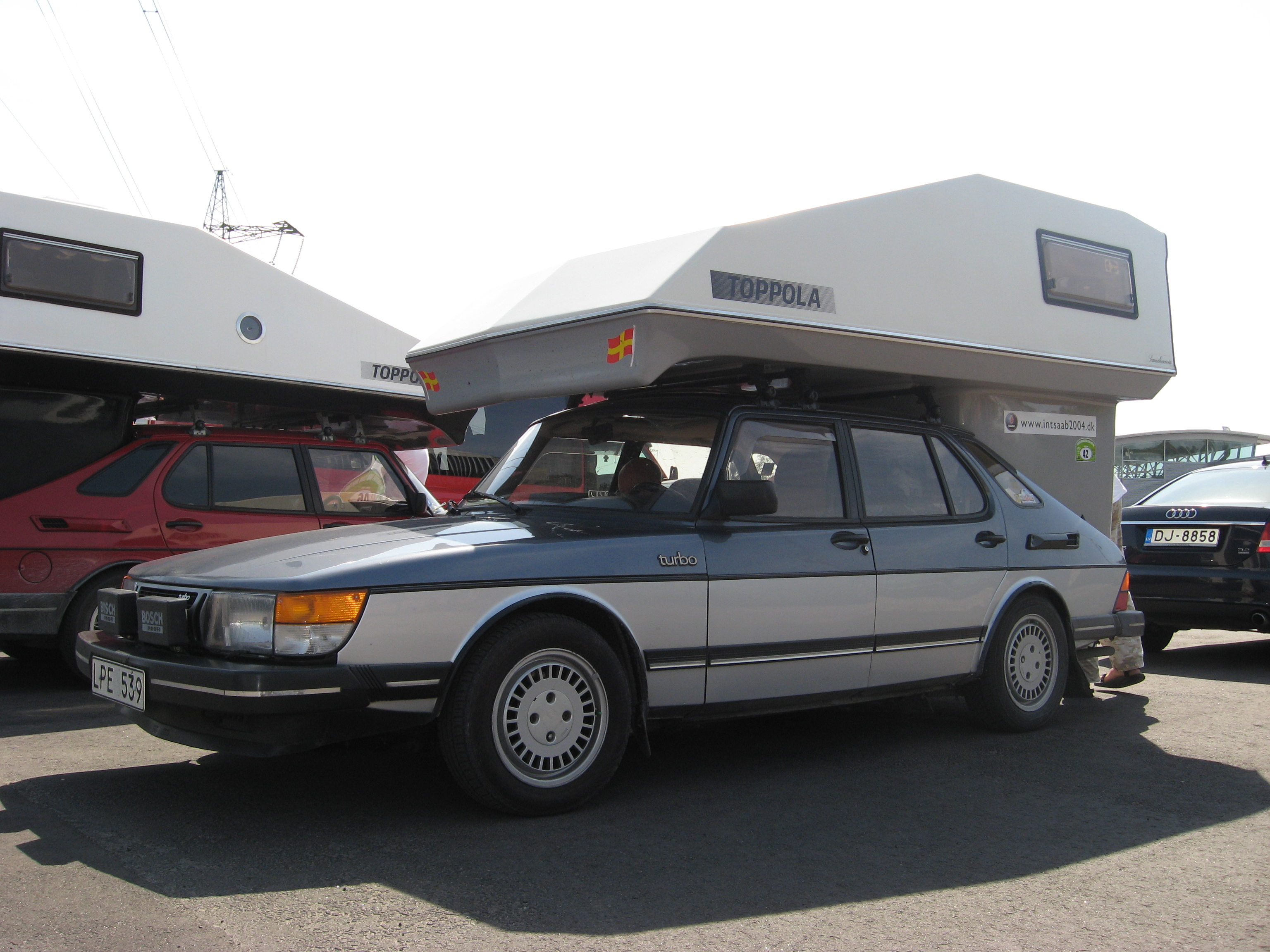
900 'Lux' with a Toppola camper shell

The Lux was a special model available 1983 and 1984. It came in a two-tone paint, usually slate blue metallic on top and silver below. It had a three-spoke steering wheel or more rarely four-spoke. It was one of the rarest models sold by the company, but the number produced is unknown.

==== 900 SE ====
The SE model was produced in May 1990 and was sold as a five-door hatchback. A special colour called Iridium Blue with blue pinstripes down the sides. The car also featured multi-spoke alloys, full suite of electric equipment, grey leather seats, and wood effect as standard. Only 300 were originally made for the UK-market, with a choice of either a 2.0L N/A engine or 2.0L LPT version. Later more SE versions were made, e.g. the US-market SE Turbo convertible (1991), which gained the SPG's body kit and wheels, and the three-door LPT 900 SE Aero (1993). However, these were not part of the original limited run.

==== 900 Carlsson ====
The Carlsson was a special edition 900 produced in honour of Erik Carlsson, of which only 600 examples were sold in the three years it was in production (1990 to 1992) and only available in the UK. It is thought by most that there were only 200 examples sold but in fact there were 200 examples sold for each of those three years. The standard colours which were offered were white, black or red but at the end of production, customers had the choice to order the Carlsson in a bespoke colour. All 900 Carlssons were three-door hatchbacks, had a body coloured AirFlow body kit, were fitted with twin chrome exhausts, whaletail rear spoiler and were powered by the 1,985 cc turbocharged engine with an upgraded (Red) APC producing 185 hp (138 kW; 188 PS). The 900 Carlsson was also equipped with the "Type 8" primary gear set.

==== 1993 and 1994 Commemorative Editions ====
314 Commemorative Edition 900 Turbo three-door Hatchback Coupés were made for the U.S. market in 1993. All the cars were painted solid black with a tan leather interior and had five-speed manual transmissions. The horsepower was increased to 185 bhp (138 kW) by outfitting the cars with the "red box" APC controller, a 2.8 bar fuel pressure regulator (base turbo was 2.5 bar), and a distributor with enhanced vacuum advance. The cars rode on the SPG suspension. The interior was further embellished by a walnut dash facia and a leather gear knob and gaiter. The wheels were 15" directionals painted medium-gray metallic units with a polished lip. Each Commemorative Edition was shipped with a small brass plaque indicating its number in the series. The plaques were serialized to indicate its number out of 325. However, only 314 were actually built. In addition, 15 identically equipped cars were shipped to Canada, and were equipped with metric (kilometer) speedometer instruments.

500 Commemorative Edition 900T convertibles were delivered to the U.S. market in 1994. They were the last 500 classic 900 convertibles to be built. They had the same performance modifications as the 1993 Commemorative Edition vehicles with the exception of the lower SPG suspension. They all had the five-speed manual transmission, and came with the same uniquely styled wheels, walnut dash facia, and leather gear knob and gaiter. The tan leather interior was further enhanced with black piping, which was exclusive to this model. The cars were all painted Nova Black Metallic (another feature exclusive to the 1994 Commemorative Edition) and had tan canvas tops. 500 identically equipped cars were shipped to Canada but have metric instruments. The 1994 CE vehicles did not have a plaque designating or celebrating the series. The VIN numbers do however run sequentially which, along with the Ruby, were the only Saab special edition series to do so.

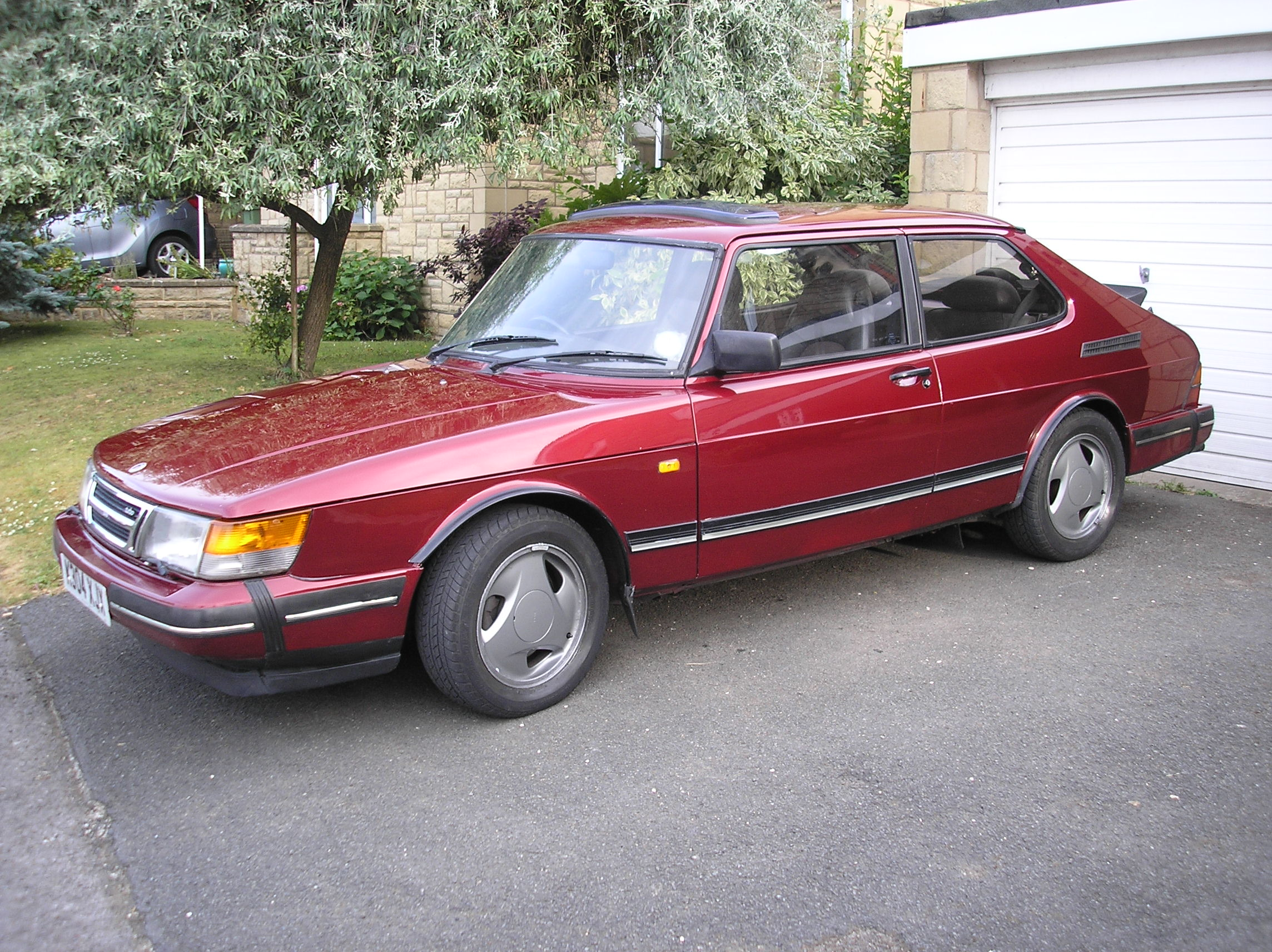
Saab 900 Ruby

==== 900 Ruby ====
Only available in the UK, the Ruby had the 185 bhp (138 kW; 188 PS) 'Carlsson' engine but no body kit. All were in 'Ruby' Red and can be distinguished from other 900s by the colour-coded bumpers and grey (rather than silver) alloy wheels. They also had the unique air-conditioned interior of buffalo leather with Zegna pure wool inserts in the seats and door panels. There were 150 examples, which were the last classic style 900s sold in the UK.

==== Swedish Special Edition ====
15 rarer LHD "Ruby" versions were also produced. 8 were made available to the Swedish market, known as the "Swedish Special Edition" and the rest were scattered in Europe. They were identical to the UK spec but had a more refined lower dash or knee guard and electric front seats.

==== Dealer models ====
Some Saab dealers in different countries made special models, which were also promoted through advertisements, for example: "Saab 900 Sprint" and "Saab 900 Sport", offered through Wimbledon Saab (which was in that time owned by Saab UK) The "Sprint" had a special body kit, lower, stiffer springs, and Pirelli Cinturato P7 on 7"×16" wheels. It also came with an intercooler, full colour-coding and three-spoke leather steering wheel. The "Sport" had alloy wheels, full colour-coding and spoilers, uprated suspension, three-spoke leather steering wheel, Clarion stereo and an electric aerial.

Heuschmid GmbH (Germany) offered options such as tuning, intercooler, suspensions tweaking and custom alloy wheels.

Saab A.I.M of the Netherlands made two special models; both in an attempt to sell off eight-valve turbos late in the model's life.

1. Red Arrow: a red 900 Turbo eight-valve two-door (MY 1987 and 1988 – slant nose) with a grey AirFlow body kit and a whale tail spoiler. 150 were planned, 100 with whale tail and SuperInca wheels and 50 without whaletail and with 15-spoke Turbo85 wheels instead. Tan cloth interior with Carlsson steering wheel, manual side mirrors, window and no air-conditioning.
2. Silver Arrow (MY 1985 and 1986, flat nose): Metallic silver 900 Turbo eight-valve sedan (known as Tudor or notchback) with special red/anthracite side striping, wooden four-spoke steering wheel and shifter knob, aubergine velvet interior, with only manual windows and mirrors. The engine featured an intercooler and produced 155 bhp (116 kW) (no catalytic converter for Silver Arrow, so the Red Arrow made a bit less hp as it had it fitted already).

Both 'Arrows' have a 1–150 and 1–200 numbered plaque on the dashboard and also a logo on the sides of the hood – above the fenders and on the back. It is believed that none of Arrows actually reached planned numbers for the limited production run – highest Red Arrow known is 138, Silver Arrow is 186. There are also few convertible versions styled as the Red Arrow (red car with grey AirFlow body kit), with no special version designated to it.

==== Conversions (official) ====
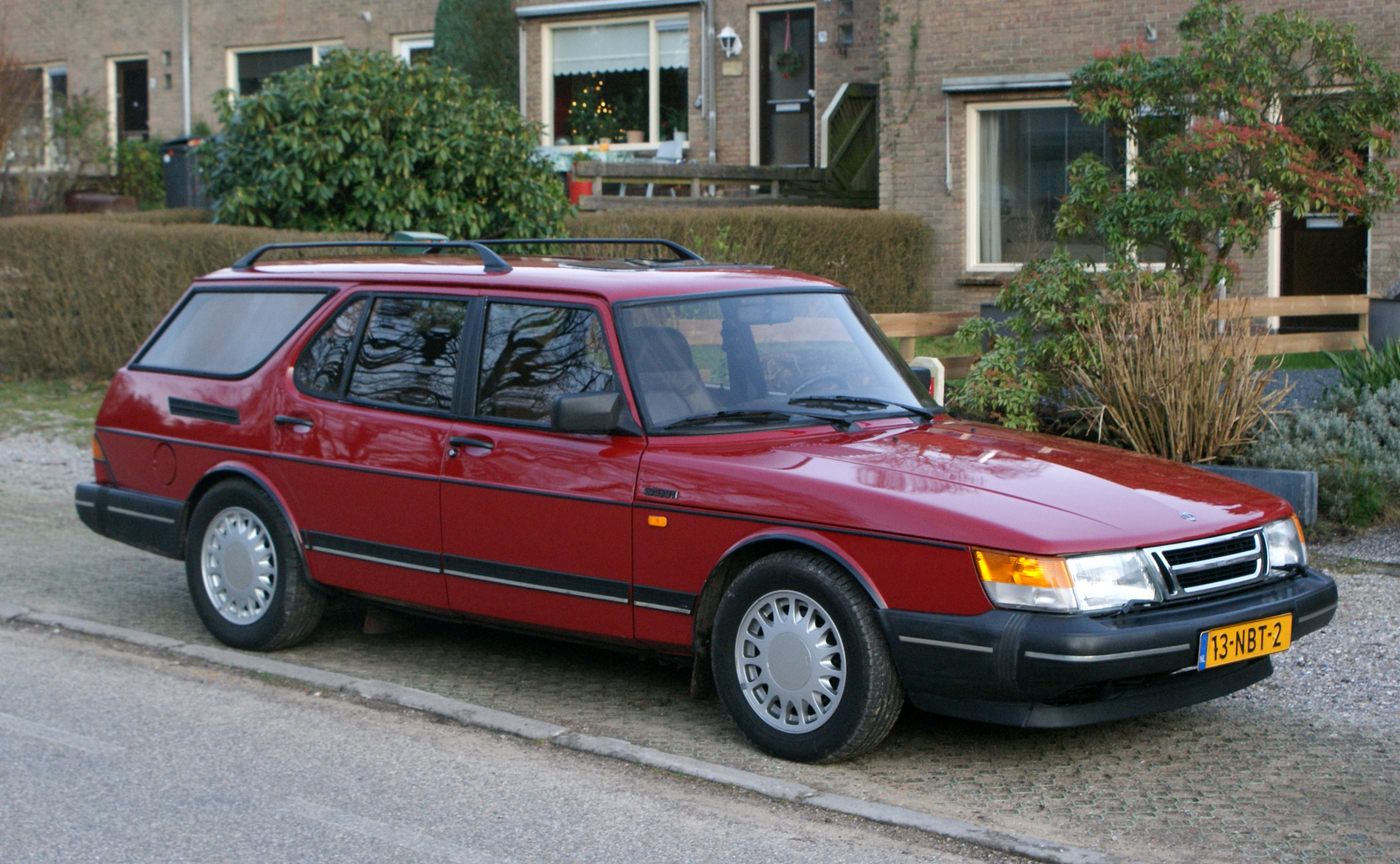
Saab 900 Safari

- Lynx Engineering produced two "convertible" models, just prior to the official 1986 launch.
- Coachbuilder Nilsson built a wagon variant, the 'Safari'.
- There were also a few limousine conversions. A typical modification is a 20 cm wheelbase stretch.

==== Toppola ====
Just as with the Saab 99 combi coupé, a camper conversion kit from Toppola was also available for the Saab 900 combi coupé. By removing the hatch and putting on the Toppola, a car could be converted to a campervan in about 15 to 30 minutes.

==== Trivia ====
A 1989 Saab 900 SPG, owned by Peter Gilbert of Wisconsin, was driven over a million miles before being donated to The Wisconsin Automotive Museum. Peter Gilbert claimed a million miles out of the turbocharging unit, in addition to the engine itself. Saab gave Mr Gilbert a Saab 9-5 Aero.

== Saab 900 NG (1994–1997) ==
Saab 900 NG
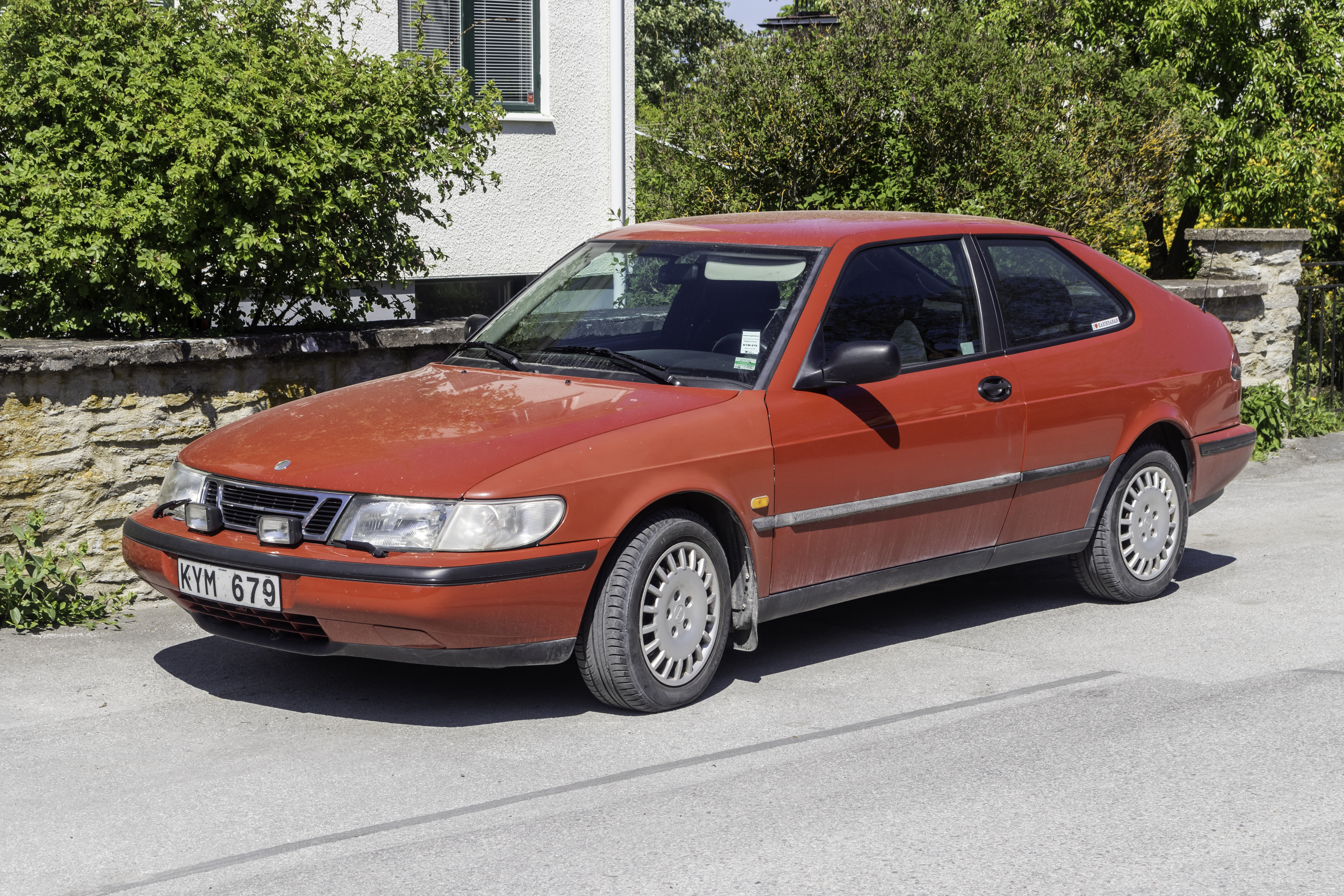
- Saab 900 three-door hatchback

Overview
- Manufacturer: Saab Automobile
- Production: 1993–1997
- Model years: 1994–1998
- Designer: Björn Envall; Aina Nilsson Ström (interior); Einar Hareide

Body and chassis
- Body style: 2-door convertible; 3-door hatchback; 5-door hatchback
- Platform: GM2900 platform
- Related: Opel Calibra; Opel Vectra; Vauxhall Cavalier; Saab 9-5; Saturn L-Series

Powertrain
- Engine: 2.0 L Saab B204 I4; 2.0 L Saab B204 turbo I4; 2.3 L Saab B234 I4; 2.5 L GM B258I V6
- Transmission: 5-speed F25 manual; 5-speed Sensonic semi-automatic; 4-speed automatic

Dimensions
- Wheelbase: 2,600 mm (102.4 in)
- Length: 4,637 mm (182.6 in)
- Width: 1,711 mm (67.4 in)
- Height: 1,436 mm (56.5 in)
- Curb weight: 1,315–1,400 kg (2,899–3,086 lb)

Chronology
- Successor: Saab 9-3

The NG 900 (“New Generation 900”), often referred to as the 900 II, 902, or GM 900, was the successor to the classic Saab 900 (referred to as the C900 or OG900 for distinction). Since 1984, Saab had been attempting to develop a successor based on the 9000 to the classic 900. This led to the internal projects X 68 (1987) and Project 102 (1988). Both had to be abandoned for cost reasons. It was not until cooperation talks with General Motors (GM) began that a breakthrough was achieved. These talks culminated in January 1990 with the founding of Saab Automobile AB, in which GM would hold a 50% stake. This gave Saab access to the GM2900 mid-size platform developed by GM for passenger cars with transverse engines and front-wheel drive. The most prominent passenger car models in Europe that used this platform were the British Vauxhall Cavalier III and the identical Opel Vectra A, on which these two (GM) brands had developed their respective models and launched them on the market as early as 1988. The platform was subsequently also used by other GM brands such as Holden, Saturn, and, of course, Saab. During development, however, the GM platform was significantly modified by Swedish engineers to better meet SAAB internal specifications. Compared to the Opel Vectra A and Vauxhall Cavalier, this included, among other things, improved crash safety through the addition of reinforcements in the doors and other body parts. For example, when viewed from below, there is no resemblance between the underbody of a Vectra A and that of a NG 900. The fact is that the exterior and interior design of the Saab NG 900 originated in Trollhättan, and the V4 engines, the manual transmission, the chassis (for the most part), and the electronics were developed in-house by Saab for the new vehicle.

Pre-production of the NG 900 began on May 10, 1993. The goal was to reduce production time to just 40 hours—roughly one-third of the production time for both its predecessor, the OG900, and the 9000, which was being built in parallel. This was possible because, for the first time, many parts were delivered pre-assembled. After four years of refinement, development, and testing, the “New Generation” Saab 900 finally made its debut on July 21, 1993, in front of the press and 35,000 residents of Trollhättan in the city’s main square. The NG 900 was well received by both the Swedish press and the public: Over 3,000 orders were placed within the first ten days. The Saab 900 had not been among the top three best-selling models in Sweden since 1988. Therefore, the sales success of the new 900 was a notable achievement: in its first full year of sales, 1994, the NG 900 ranked third with 10,791 sales and a 6.9% market share in its home market (ranking fourth and fifth in the following two years).

The NG 900 was introduced to the market as a 1994 model year (MY), the convertible was launched a year later as a 1995 model year vehicle. The NG 900 was produced in all variants until the beginning of (calendar year) 1998 as the MY 98 (and, in its final MY 98, anticipated some technical changes of its successor, the 9-3).

Although the NG 900 deliberately incorporated some of the C900 signature styling elements both inside and out, it was a model that had been completely redeveloped and redesigned from a technical standpoint and was the first Saab model built on a GM floor pan. The NG 900 is shorter than the C900 and the 9000. But combined with the longer wheelbase (2600 vs. 2519 mm), this results in a subjectively and objectively larger usable interior compared to the C900. In the NG 900, three adults can sit side by side on the rear bench seat, and even tall passengers do not bump their heads on the headliner in the back. In the U.S., the NG 900 was therefore reclassified as a “midsize car” (the C900 had been classified as a “compact” cart, the 9000 as a "large" car). The NG 900 was built in only three body styles: as a 5-door hatchback (5D), a 3-door coupe (3D), and a convertible (CV). A sedan version was not offered. The closed-body variants were produced exclusively at the main plant in Trollhättan. The convertible was manufactured at Valmet in Uusikaupunki, Finland. After manual unlocking, the convertible’s fabric top opens electrically at the push of a button and is fully open in about 40 seconds. A total of six electric motors power the top and the hardtop cover.

At its market launch the NG 900 was once again state-of-the-art (including in terms of crash safety, where it was even superior to the 9000 CS, since the 9000 based on a platform that was already 10 years old at the time). A special safety feature that Saab introduced internally for the first time with the NG 900 (and which, for example, the 9000 did not have) was the design of the center seat belt on the rear bench as a 3-point seat belt, secured to a sturdy crossbar.

=== Trim levels and engine variants ===
Saab generally limited the NG to two trim levels: “S” and “SE,” which were also part of the emblem on the rear of each model. Later, Saab offered an additional base model as simple "900 i" with the smallest engine (2.0i) in some markets. The 900i lost its rear-window wiper, the exclusive Saab Information Display (SID), and utilized a different instrument layout with a mechanical odometer instead of a digital one; early models even lacked a tachometer. But every NG 900 included power windows (front and rear), central locking, power-adjustable and heated exterior mirrors, headlight wipers and washers, a split rear bench seat, and many other features that often came at an extra cost on competing models. ABS, a driver’s airbag (and, starting with the ’96 model year, a passenger airbag as well), and power steering were also standard equipment. Some later 900i models were also equipped with a standard instrument cluster and the basic SID. The 900i was only available in Europe, Australia, New Zealand and Japan, as a three-door or a five-door with a choice of a 2.0 or 2.3 L engine. It did not sell very well in the UK and Australia, where the S and SE models were more popular with Saab drivers. In some countries, the V6 and turbo engines were only available with the SE trim (e.g., in the U.S.); in Europe, there were more possible combinations of engines and trims.

The "S" and "SE" trim levels varied greatly in terms of equipment depending on the model year and country, although in general, the SE trim level included Air Conditioning (AC) and sporty features such as a rear spoiler, alloy wheels, fog lights, and other comfort features like cruise control and better audio system. In the U.S., as usual, the standard equipment on the SE models was significantly more extensive as in Europe, including automatic climate control (ACC), leather seats, wood trim, etc.

Depending on market, the NG900 was available with a choice of 2.0 L or 2.3 L Saab 16-valve DOHC engines (Saab B204 and B234) in naturally aspirated or turbocharged form (2.0 L only), as well as a 2.5 L version of GM's European 54° V6 engine. Engine management for the turbos was by Saab Trionic 5 with Direct Ignition (SDI) and Automatic Performance Control (APC), and for naturally aspirated models by Bosch Motronic fuel injection. A distributor-operated ignition system was provided for naturally aspirated engines in some markets.

In contrast to the 'classic' Saab 900 with its longitudinally mounted engine and front-hinged bonnet, the NG900 had a more-common transversely mounted engine with rear-hinged bonnet.

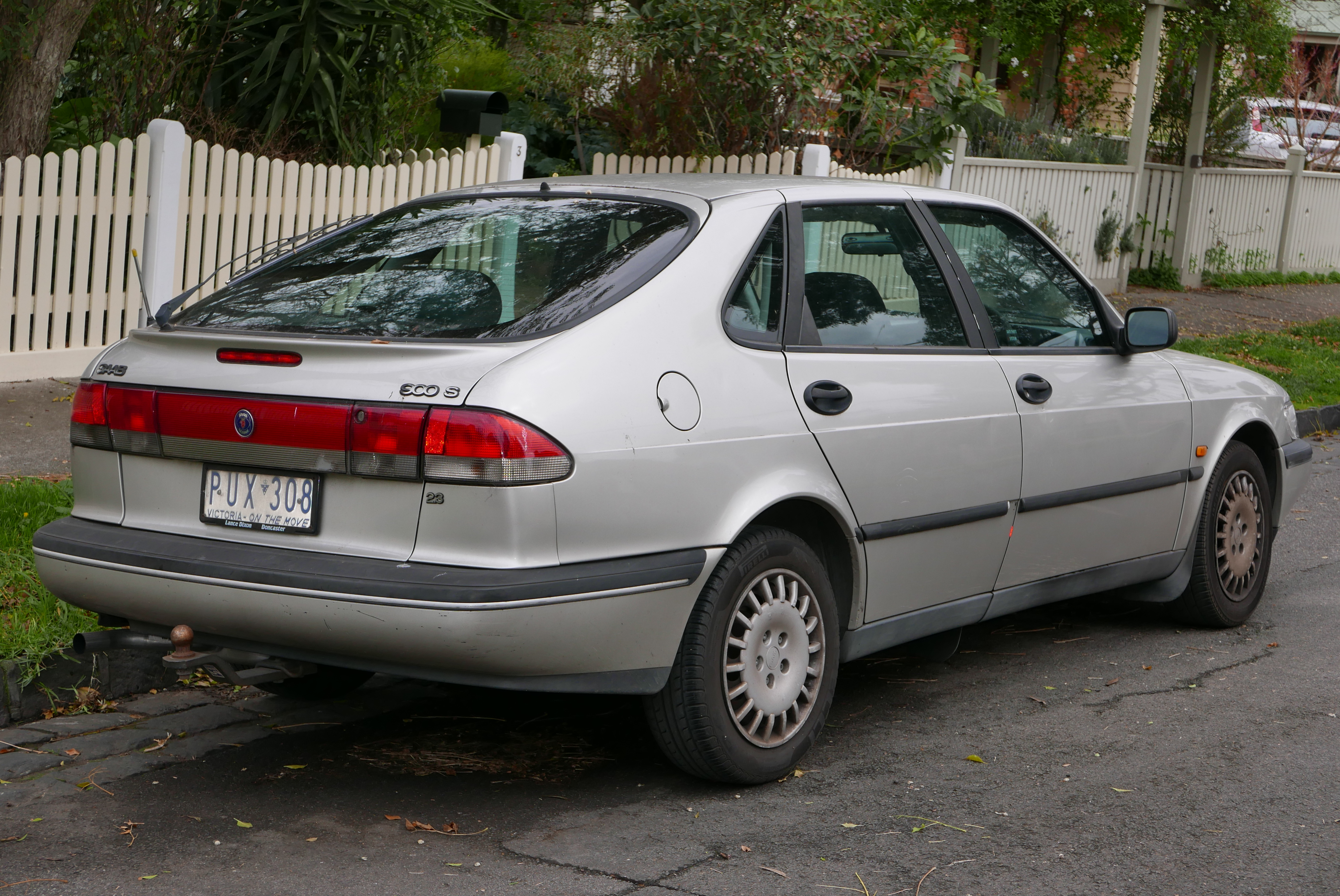
Five-door hatchback (900 S)

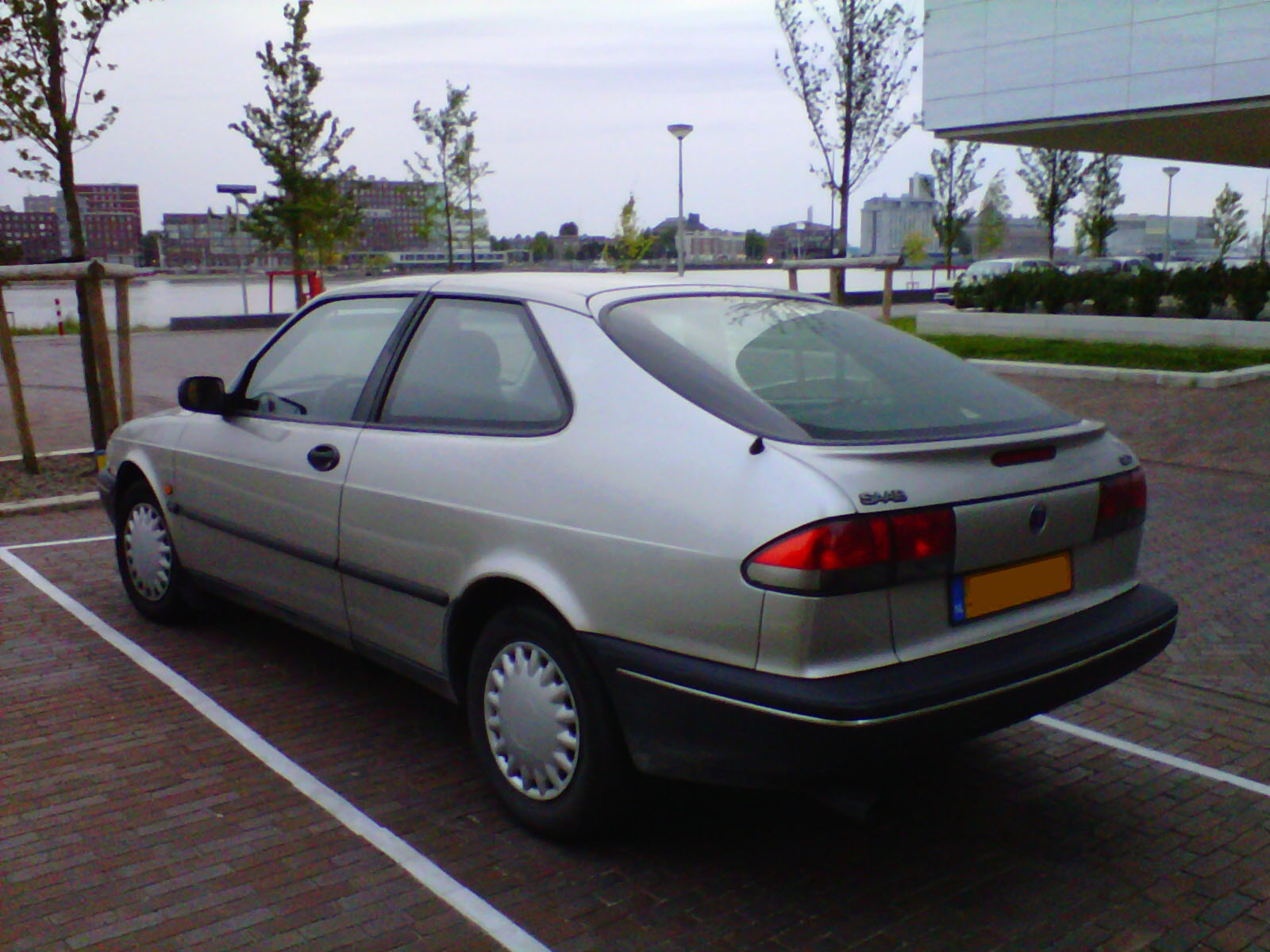
Saab 900i three-door (rear)

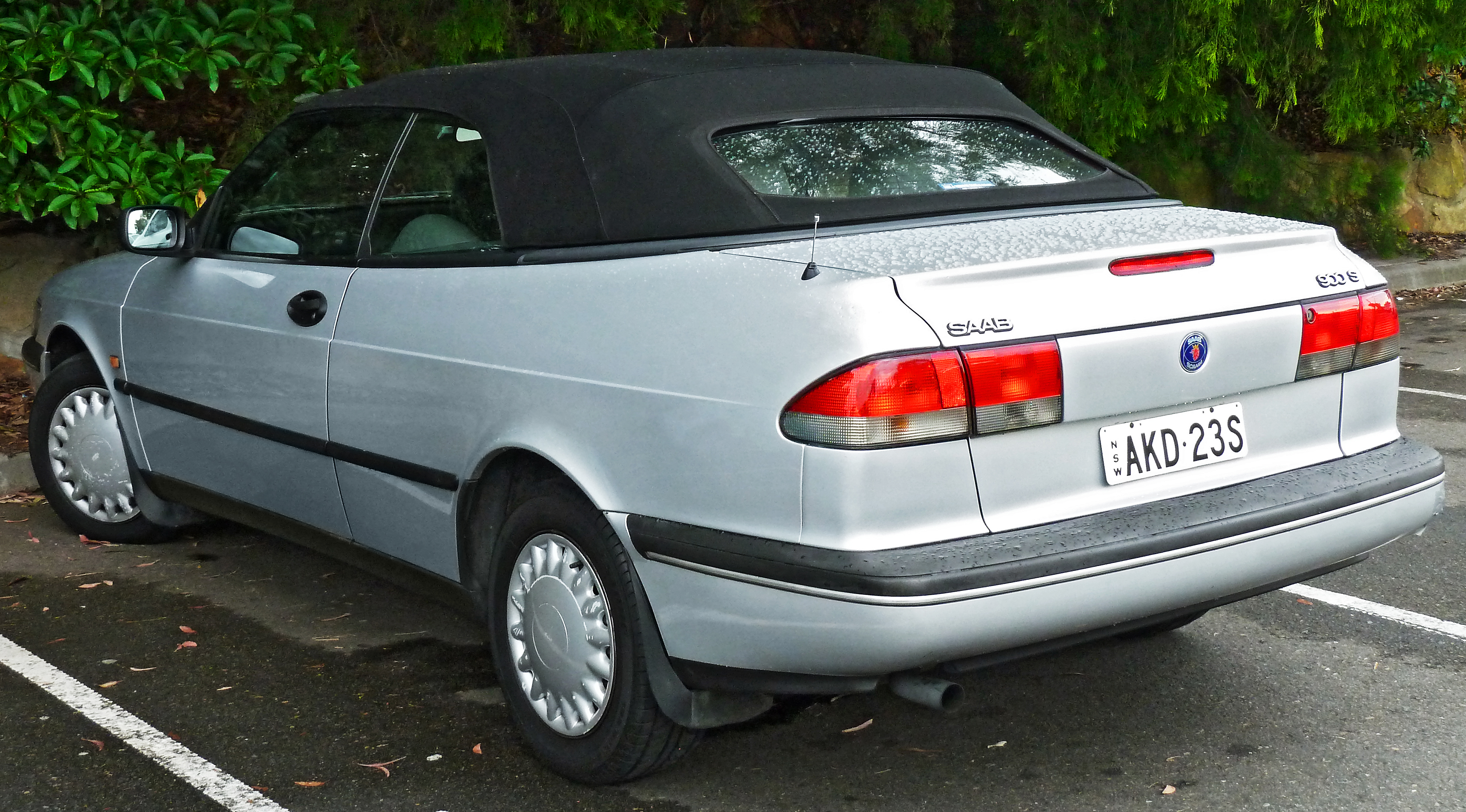
Convertible (rear)

=== NG engines ===
common technical specifications: valve train: continuous-loop chain on 4-cylinder engines, timing belt on the V6; all engines feature 4-valve technology and a 3-way catalytic converter as standard

balance shafts: 2 each on the B2x4 engines, driven by their own chain (no balance shafts on the B206i)

B206i, 1985 ccm, Max. power: 133 PS / 98 kW at 6100 rpm Max. torque: 180 Nm at 4300 rpm Acceleration: 0–100 km/h: 11.5 sec. (automatic: 12.5 sec.) Top speed: 200 km/h (195 km/h) Acceleration 60–100 km/h: 13.5 sec. (in 4th gear) Acceleration 80–120 km/h: 21.0 sec. (in 5th gear) Fuel consumption according to EU Directive 89/491 (city/90/120 km/h): 11.3; 6.6; 7.7 (13; 6.6; 7.7) in l/100 km

The B206 was the last Saab engine without balance shafts and was available in Europe only in the 1994 model year as an alternative base model to the B204i.

B 204i, 1985 ccm, Max. power: 130 PS / 96 kW at 6100 rpm Max. torque: 177 Nm at 4300 rpm Acceleration: 0–100 km/h: 11 sec. (automatic: 13 sec.) Top speed: 200 km/h (190 km/h) Acceleration 60–100 km/h: 11.5 sec. (in 4th gear) Acceleration 80–120 km/h: 18.0 sec. (in 5th gear) Fuel consumption according to EU Directive 89/491 (city/90/120 km/h): 12.5; 7.0; 8.3 (13.3; 6.9; 8.5) in l/100 km

The B204i transmission ratio is relatively short by comparison. While this results in good acceleration figures, it also leads to higher fuel consumption, especially at highway speeds.

B234i, 2290 ccm Max. power: 150 PS / 110 kW at 5700 rpm Max. torque: 210 Nm at 4300 rpm Acceleration: 0–100 km/h: 10 sec. (automatic: 11 sec.) Top speed: 210 km/h (205 km/h) Acceleration 60–100 km/h: 10 sec. (in 4th gear) Acceleration 80–120 km/h: 16 sec. (in 5th gear) Fuel consumption according to EU Directive 89/491 (city/90/120 km/h): 11.7; 6.6; 7.9 (13.0; 6.8; 7.7) in l/100 km

Unlike in the 9000, the B234i in the NG 900 stood out for its comparatively low fuel consumption and was the most popular engine option.

B204L, 1,985 ccm, turbo, Garrett TB2569 turbocharger Max. power: 185 PS / 136 kW at 5,500 rpm (automatic: at 5,750 rpm) Max. torque: 263 Nm at 2,100 rpm (230 Nm at 2,000 rpm) Max. boost pressure: 0.95 bar (0.66 bar) Acceleration: 0–100 km/h: 8.5 sec. (automatic: 8.5 sec.) Top speed: 230 km/h (230 km/h) Acceleration 60–100 km/h: 8.2 sec. (in 4th gear) Acceleration 80–120 km/h: 11.5 sec. (in 5th gear) Fuel consumption per EU Directive 89/491 (city/90/120 km/h): 12.5; 6.3; 8.2 (13.7; 6.7; 8.5) in l/100 km

The B204L was also used in the Saab 9000 (in some markets) and the later 9-3.

B258i, 2498 ccm, V6, Opel code C25XE Max. power: 170 PS / 125 kW at 5900 rpm Max. torque: 227 Nm at 4200 rpm Acceleration: 0–100 km/h: 9.2 sec. (automatic: 9.2 sec.) Top speed: 225 km/h (225 km/h) Acceleration 60–100 km/h: 9 sec. (in 4th gear) Acceleration 80–120 km/h: 13 sec. (in 5th gear) Fuel consumption according to EU Directive 89/491 (city/90/120 km/h): 12.1; 7.0; 8.3 (13.0; 7.1; 8.4) in l/100 km

The NG 900 with a V6 engine came standard with TCS (the TCS was supplied by Opel and was therefore not available for the other engine variants).

=== Sensonic ===
The 'Sensonic' clutch variant (available on Turbo models only) provided a manual gear lever as in a standard manual transmission car but omitted the clutch pedal in favor of electronics which could control the clutch faster than an average driver, essentially turning it into a clutchless manual transmission.

When the driver started to move the gearshift, a computer-controlled microprocessor would drive an electric motor, in turn, operating a hydraulic actuator connected to the clutch master cylinder, which used hydraulic fluid, and controlled the clutch automatically. With the car in gear but stationary, the clutch was engaged only when the throttle was applied. If neither brake nor gas pedal was depressed, a warning tone sounded and a message flashed on the on-board display, and if no action was taken after seven seconds, the engine was shut off.

Printed in error, a "Hill Start" function for Sensonic-equipped cars (as described in the owner's manual under "Rolling") was intended to assist in getting underway on hills to prevent rolling forwards or backwards. However, this feature was not implemented on any production unit.

The 'Sensonic' clutch ceased production when the 900 model was replaced in 1998.

=== Saab Information Display ===
The NG900 introduced the Saab Information Display, or SID (available on S or SE models only), which gave the driver real-time information while driving, such as fuel efficiency and outside temperature. Base specification cars had a digital clock in place of the SID and a non-digital instrument panel with a mechanical odometer (as opposed to the digital odometer on higher-spec models). The SID also controlled other vehicle components, including but not limited to audible warnings for turn signals and the vehicle's horn.

=== Night Panel ===
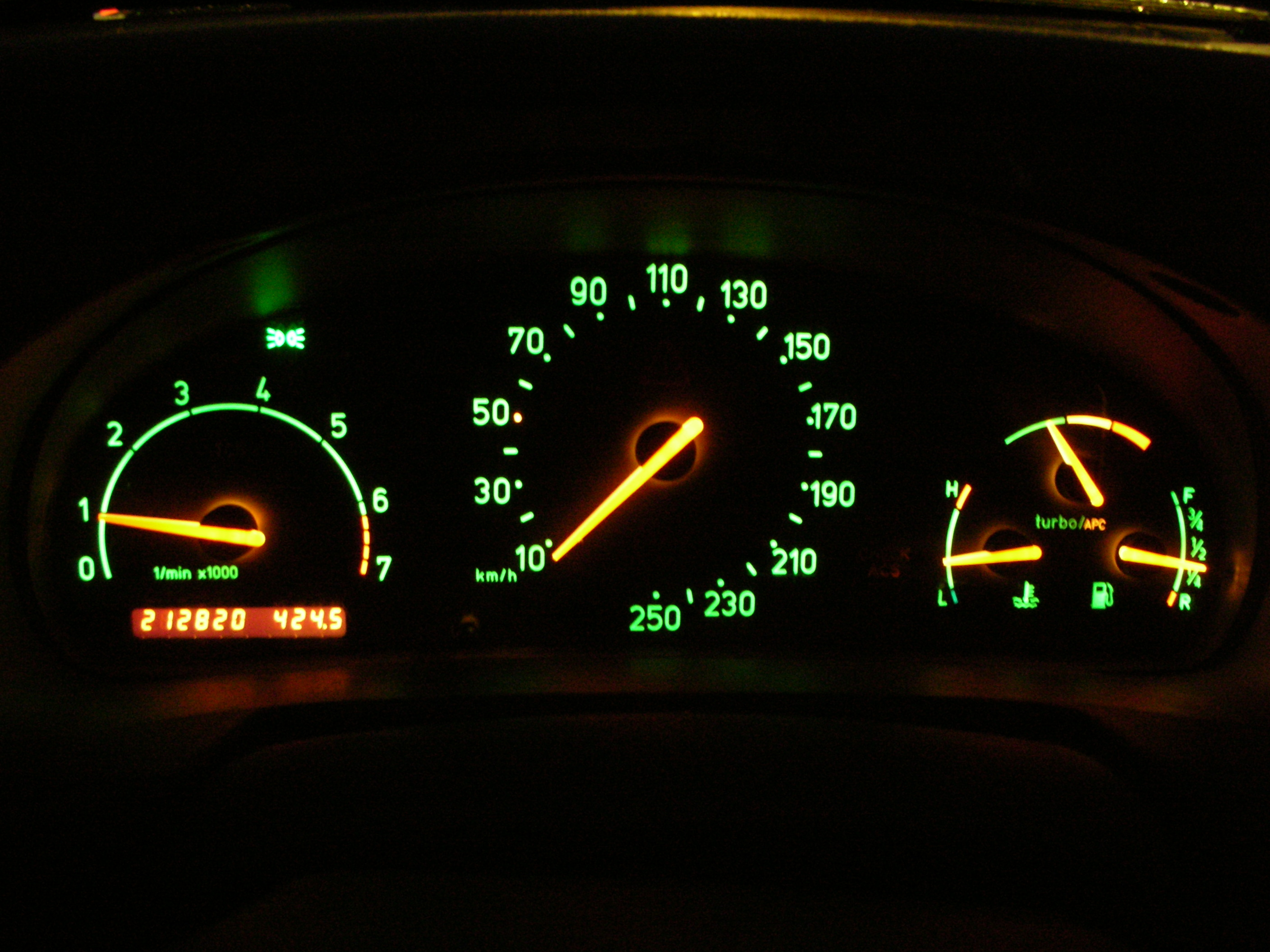
Panel illuminated

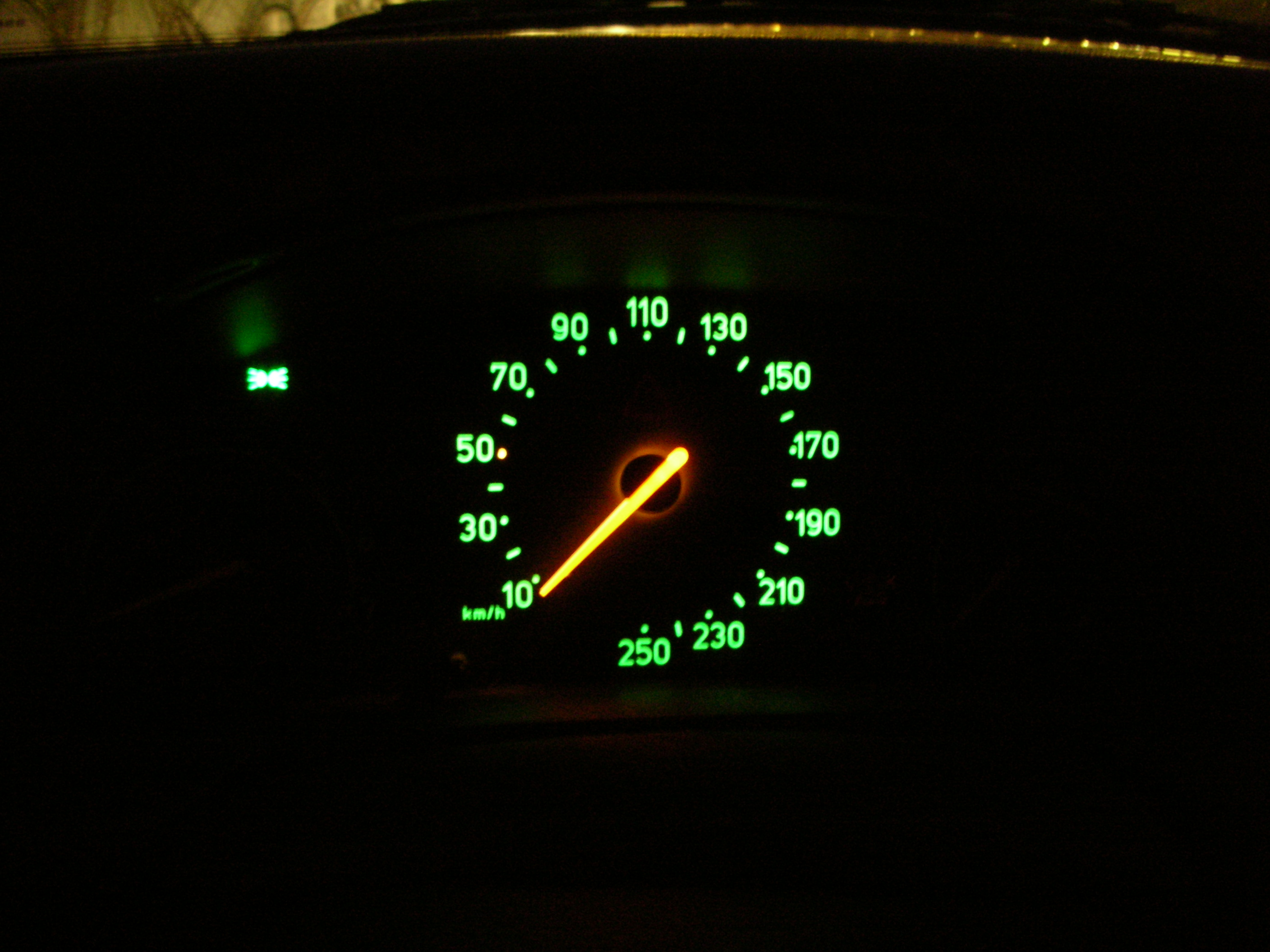
Night Panel

One Saab innovation, inspired by the company's roots in aeronautics, was the 'Black Panel' feature available in classic models through the turn of the panel dimming knob, and subsequently available (on S and SE models only), through the touch of a button on the SID (Saab Information Display) digital panel (classics had analog display), which extinguished most instrument panel lights, to eliminate distraction from dash lights during night driving. While active, the SID activated feature permitted darkened instruments to re-illuminate themselves when they required driver attention – if for example, the engine speed increased alarmingly or if the fuel level should drop below 15 litres (4 US gal). This feature was later renamed 'Night Panel' in Saab 9-3 and Saab 9-5 models. In the later Night Panel version, the speedometer is only illuminated up to the 87 mph (140 km/h) mark. The remainder of the scale will only be illuminated if the speed of the car exceeds 84 mph (135 km/h).

=== Special edition models ===
Essentially, throughout the entire production run of the 900 NG, Saab offered only a single, standardized special edition model across the various markets directly from the factory. The occasion was the “Saab Talladega Challenge” in October 1996 at Talladega Speedway in the U.S., featuring six Saab 900 NG from series production. Vehicles equipped with naturally aspirated engines, turbocharged engines, and V6 engines took part. The date was no coincidence; it marked the 10th anniversary of Saab’s first appearance at Talladega Speedway in October 1986—since then known as the “Saab Talladega Long Run”—featuring 9000 production models. At both events, Saab broke several records with the participating vehicles.

In line with the “Saab Talladega Challenge,” Saab began offering the “Talladega” special-edition models for the NG 900 worldwide starting in the spring of 1997; these remained available for order until the end of the production run. The specifications varied somewhat by country: in the U.S. and the U.K., the “Talladega” was available only as a Turbo, whereas in Germany, the special models were offered with all 4-cylinder engines and both transmission

In addition, there were special models specific to certain countries from their respective distributors, such as the “Serie Spéciale” (1995, France), “Swiss Edition” (1996, Switzerland), “Carlsson” (1996, the Netherlands and France), or “Aero” (1996, Italy), "Sunbeach CV" (1996, Germany), "Mellow Yellow CV" (1997, Germany and US), "Sport" (1996, Germany).

One notable edition model was the Weinmann small-series motorsport model “R 900 by Weinmann Motorsport,” a 3-door coupe, with 146 units produced. Commissioned by Saab Germany, this special model was developed for the 1996 model year (available for order starting in spring 1996) in collaboration with the German company Weinmann Motorsport, an engine and tuning specialist based in Upper Franconia.

=== The end of the Saab 900 ===
During the NG 900’s production run of just under five full years, from summer 1993 to end of 1997, a total of 273,568 units were produced (91,560 of which were for the U.S. market alone¹). The NG 900 was responsible for Saab’s sales figures rebounding from their 1994 low of just 71,000 units to exceed 100,000 cars per year again as early as 1997, and for Saab posting its first operating profit in 1995. Despite the popularity of the model and the “900” model name, the marketing department in Trollhättan (or Detroit or Rüsselsheim) decided in 1997 that the time had come for a “rebranding”. Thus, in early 1998, the era of the “Saab 900” model series—which had begun on May 12, 1978—came to an end after nearly 20 years. On January 6, 1998, the successor debuted under the new model designation “9-3,” in line with the 9-5, which had already been introduced in 1997 as the successor to the Saab 9000. Even though the 9-3 was more of a visual and technical “facelift” of the NG 900, Saab made every effort to position the 9-3 as a new model. Consequently, the unveiling no longer took place in Trollhättan but at the Detroit Motor Show.

== Awards ==
1998

- Best in Class, cars US$25,000-35,000 (900 S Turbo) – Kiplinger's Personal Finance, US

1996

- Among Top Ten Sports Cars – Consumer's Review, US
- IBCAM British Steel Auto Design Award (Saab 900 2.0i Coupé) – The Institute of British Carriage and Automobile Manufacturers, Great Britain
- Best Buy – Consumers Digest, US
- New world-records for endurance, at Talladega, US

1995

- Top Car in its Price Class (Saab 900 SEV6) – American Automobile Association (AAA)
- Best Buy – Consumers Digest, US
- Among Top Ten Sports Cars – Consumer's Review, US
- Technology Award 1995 for Saab Sensonic – Autocar, Great Britain

1993 and 1994

- Top Choice in annual Car of the Year reader poll – Autoweek Magazine, US
- Annual Special Prize To Saab Safeseat – Motoring Journalists' Club, Denmark
- One of the Ten Most Improved Cars And Trucks of 1994 – Syndicated automotive experts Mike Anson and Steven Parker, US
- Import Car of the Year 1993/94 in Japan – RJC (Automotive Researchers and Journalists Conference of Japan), Japan
- Best Buy – Consumers Digest, US
- Excellent Swedish Design 1994 – The Swedish Society of Crafts and Design, Sweden
- Family Car of the Year (900S) – Motoring '94, Canada
- Scandinavian Design Prize 1994 – The Scandinavian Design Council (The Nordic Design Centres)
- Executive Car of the Year 1994 – Portuguese Car Trophy
- 1993 Best Buy – Consumers Digest, US
- 1994 Design of the Year – Automobile magazine, US
- Best New Car – Kiplinger's Personal Finance magazine, US
- Car of the Year 1993 – Moottori magazine, Finland
- Best of What's New – Popular Science, US
- 2nd Most Popular Car – STATUS magazine, Germany
- 1994 Technology of the Year (for Saab Trionic) – Automobile magazine, US

== Sale of intellectual rights to BAIC ==
In January 2010, General Motors confirmed it was selling the intellectual property rights of the New Generation 900 along with the pre-2010 Saab 9-5 and pre-2012 Saab 9-3 to the Beijing Automotive Group (BAIC) for US$197 million. The package included three vehicle platforms, two transmission systems, and two engine systems.

== Motorsport ==
A one-make motor racing series for Saab 900 Turbos ran in the UK from 1986 to 1988. Among the most notable drivers to win a race in this series included Tiff Needell, future F1 World Champion Damon Hill, Barrie "Whizzo" Williams and Gerry Marshall.

== In popular culture ==
Haruki Murakami's short story Drive My Car from the collection Men Without Women features a yellow Saab 900 Turbo. The 2021 film adaptation of the same story features the same car in red and plays a major role in the movie.

In the popular television series Seinfeld, Jerry Seinfeld owned a black Saab 900 classic convertible in season 5; in subsequent seasons he owned a black NG900 convertible. The NG900 was featured in many plots of the later seasons, most notably The Bottle Deposit and The Dealership.

== Literature ==
- Cole, Lance (2011). Saab 99 and 900: The Complete Story. Ramsbury, Wiltshire, UK: The Crowood Press. ISBN 978-1-84797-352-8.
- Horner, Richard (2016). The Classic Saab 900'. Stroud, UK: Amberley Publishing. ISBN 978-1445653730.
- Searle, Matt (2024). ICON: Saab 900 T16S. Ramsbury, Wiltshire, UK: MCS DesignPublication. ISBN 978-1399981613.
