= Consumers Digest =

American magazine

- Founded: 1959
- Final issue: February 2019
- Company: Consumers Digest Communications, LLC
- Based in: Chicago
- Language: English
- Website: consumersdigest.com
- ISSN: 0010-7182
- OCLC: 1607834

Founded in 1959 and published by Consumers Digest Communications, LLC, Consumers Digest was an American magazine. It was based in Chicago. The last issue was published in February 2019.

The magazine had no subscribers and did not test the products they select as 'Best Buys'. Instead, companies paid Consumers Digest for the right to promote their products as 'Best Buys'. They relied on consumer confusion of their name with the well-known Consumer Reports magazine, published by the nonprofit organization Consumers Union. Consumers Digest Communications is a privately owned, for-profit business entity.

== History ==
The magazine was sold at newsstands only and did not reveal its sales figures. In 2001, when it ceased subscription distribution, it listed 700,000 subscribers (the list was sold to Time, Inc.). The publication has no connection with the Consumer Reports magazine or with Consumers Digest Weekly. It was possible to subscribe to the on-line edition of Consumers Digest.

== Controversy ==
Consumers Digest had a history of not paying its contributors. In an October 30, 2017, article published by Talking Biz News (TBN), it was reported that at least three journalists were suing the company run by publisher Randy Weber for nonpayment. Two other journalists also shared their attempts to collect on what was owed them.

As of February 2019, following additional lawsuits from 2018, it appeared the company had closed down, as the website no longer appeared active and the company phone number was disconnected.
