= Saab 9-3 =

Swedish compact executive car (1998–2014)

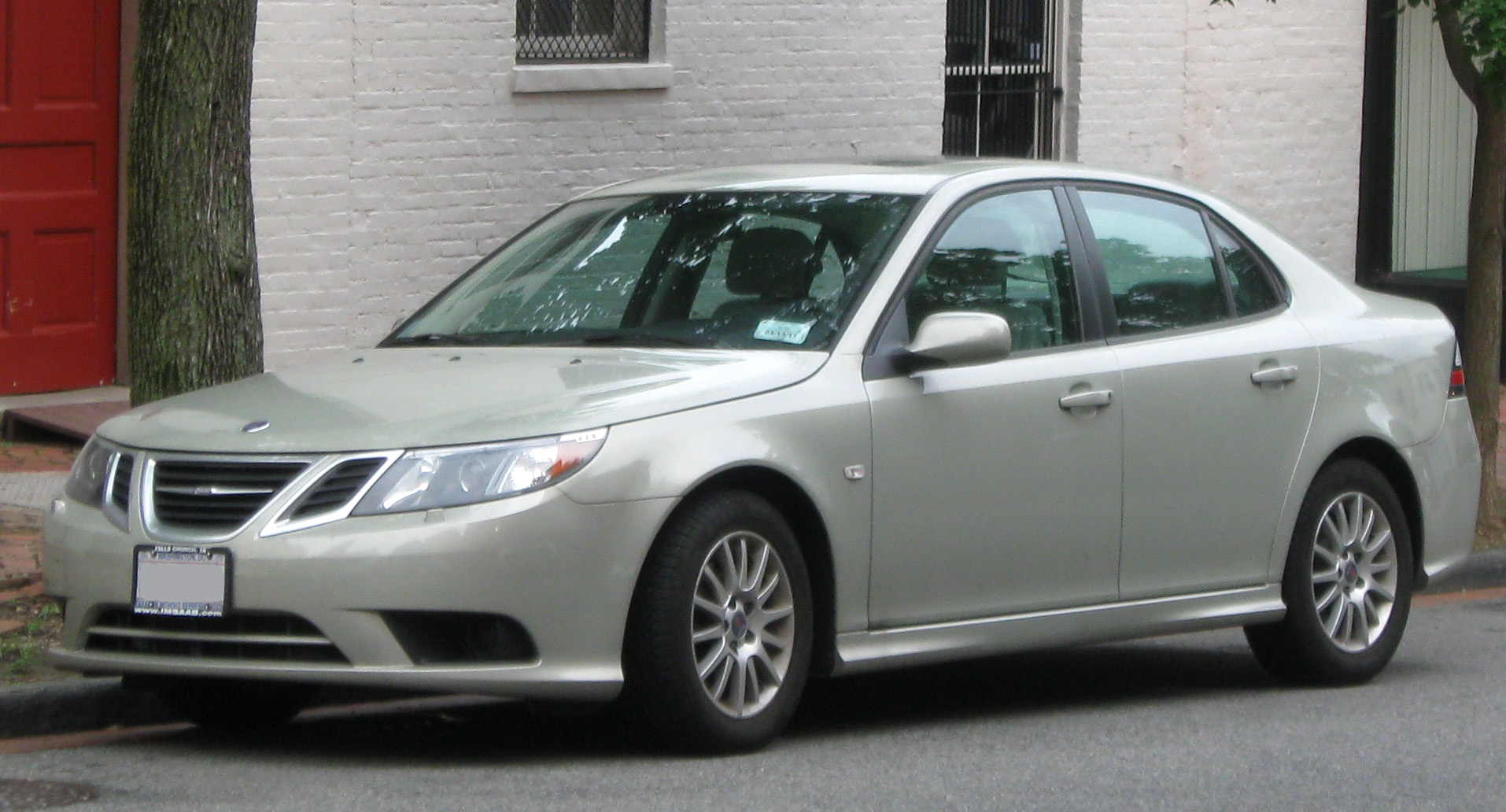
- 2008–2009 Saab 9-3 sedan

Overview
- Manufacturer: General Motors (1998–2010); Spyker Cars (2011–2012); NEVS (2013–2014)
- Production: 1998–2014

Body and chassis
- Class: Compact executive car (D)
- Layout: Front-engine, front-wheel drive (1998–2014); Front-engine, four-wheel drive (2008–2014)

Chronology
- Predecessor: Saab 900
- Successor: NEVS 9-3EV (Saab Electric Version)

The Saab 9-3 (pronounced nine-three) is a compact executive car initially developed and manufactured by the Swedish automaker Saab.

The first generation 9-3 (1998–2003) is based on the GM2900 platform, changing to the GM Epsilon platform with the introduction of the second-generation car (2003–2012). Other vehicles using this platform include the Opel Vectra, Chevrolet Malibu, and Cadillac BLS.

National Electric Vehicle Sweden (NEVS), Saab's then parent company briefly assembled a few 9-3 sedans during 2013 and 2014.

== Overview ==
The car was badged as 9^{3} starting in the 1998 model year when Saab revised the naming of the smaller car to match that of the larger 9^{5} version. The model was marketed as 9-3, pronounced as "nine three.” The Saab 9-3 was launched in 1998 for the 1999 model year essentially as a rebadged second-generation Saab 900 (1994–1998 model) and succeeded by a redesigned 9-3 for the 2003 model year. It is not related to the Saab 93 ("ninety-three"), a car produced by Saab from 1955 until 1960.

== First generation (1998–2003) ==
First generation YS3D
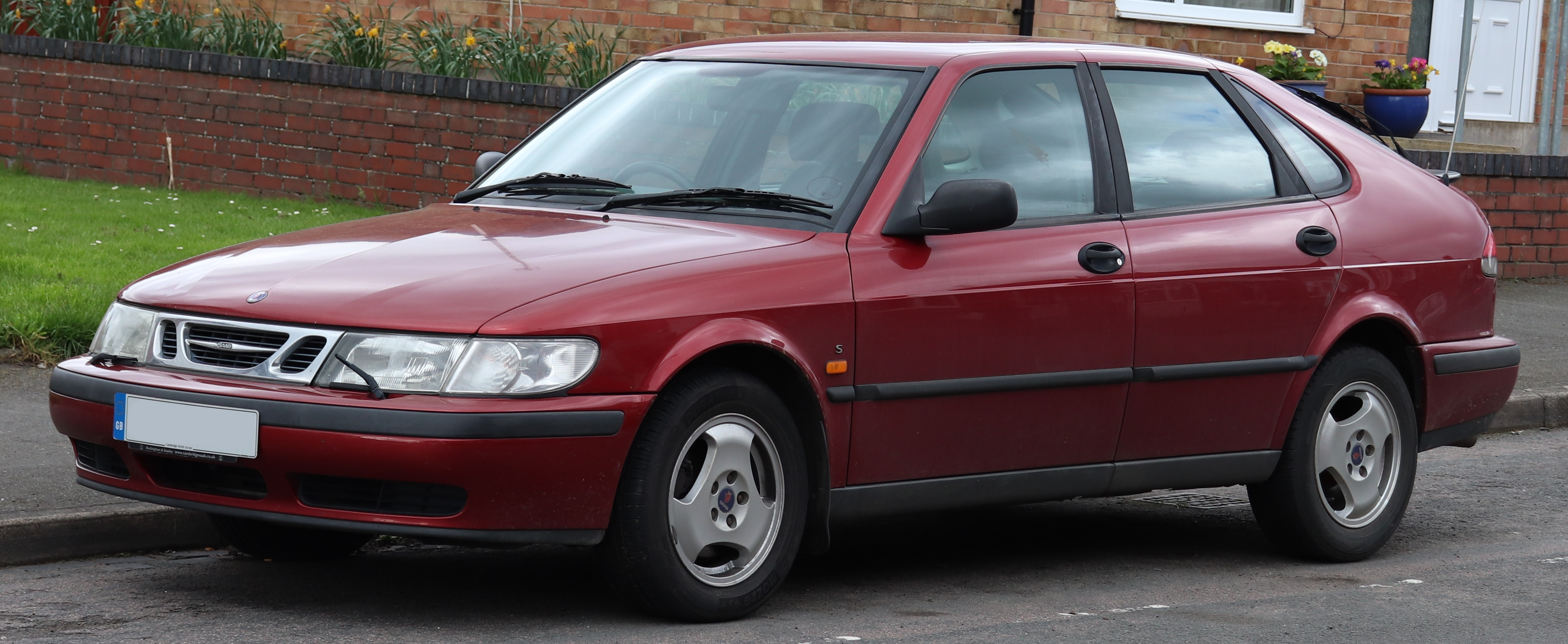

Overview
- Production: 1998–2003
- Assembly: Sweden: Trollhättan (1998–2002); Finland: Uusikaupunki (Valmet Automotive: 1999–2003)
- Designer: Einar Hareide

Body and chassis
- Body style: 3-/5-door hatchback 2-door convertible
- Layout: Transverse front-engine, front-wheel drive
- Platform: GM2900 platform
- Related: Opel Vectra B Saturn L-Series

Powertrain
- Engine: petrol: 2.0 L B204 I4; 2.0 L B205 I4; 2.0 L B205R I4; 2.3 L B235R I4; diesel: 2.2 L D223L TiD I4
- Transmission: 5-speed manual 4-speed automatic

Dimensions
- Wheelbase: 2,605 mm (102.6 in)
- Length: 1999–2000 Viggen & 2001–2002: 4,630 mm (182.3 in); 1999–2000: 4,628 mm (182.2 in); 2001–2002 Viggen: 4,640 mm (182.7 in)
- Width: 1,712 mm (67.4 in)
- Height: Hatchback: 1,427 mm (56.2 in); Convertible: 1,422 mm (56.0 in); 2001–2002 Viggen Hatchback: 1,415 mm (55.7 in); 2001–2002 Viggen Convertible: 1,410 mm (55.5 in)

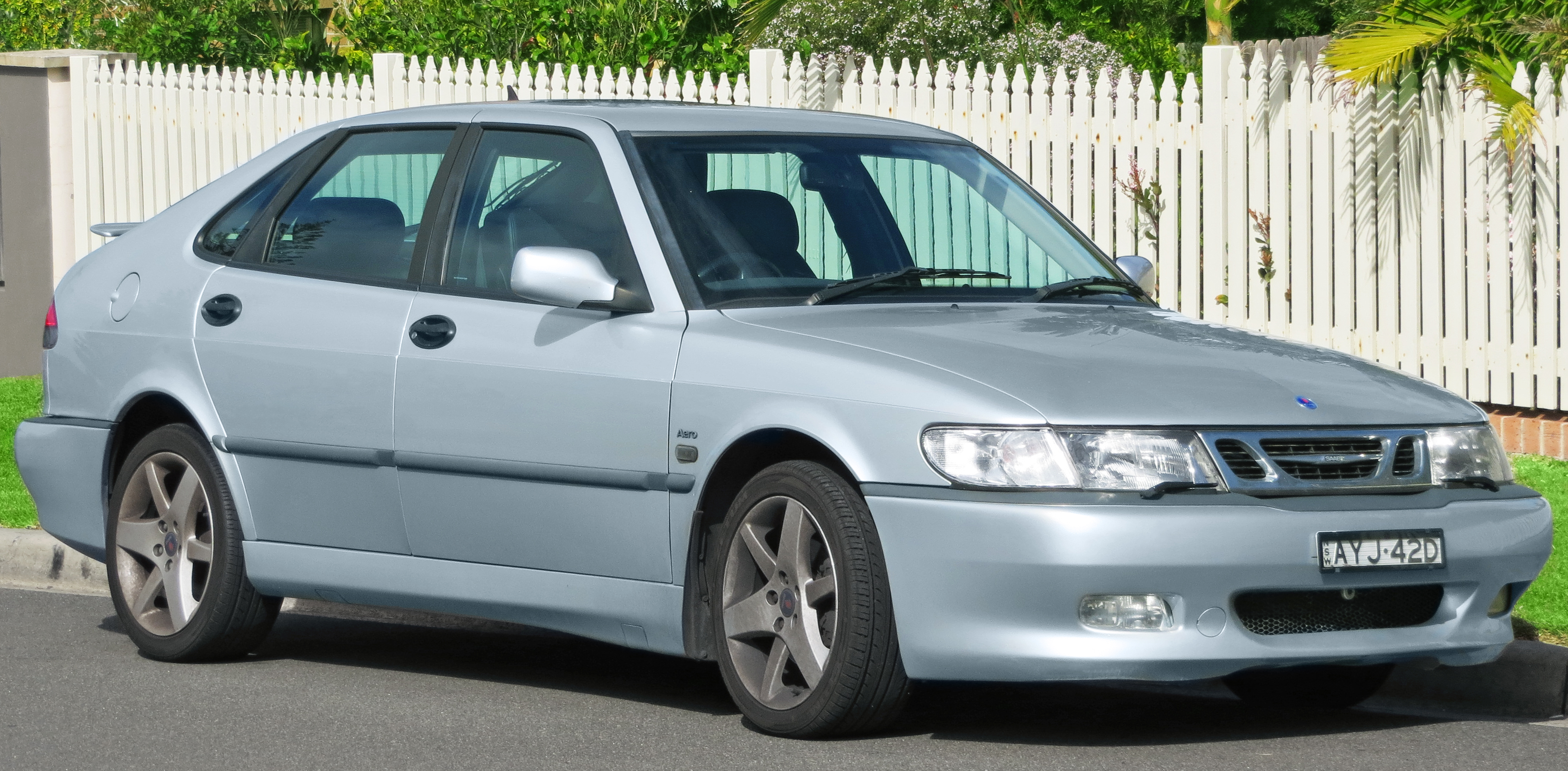
Saab 9-3 Aero 5-door (Australia)

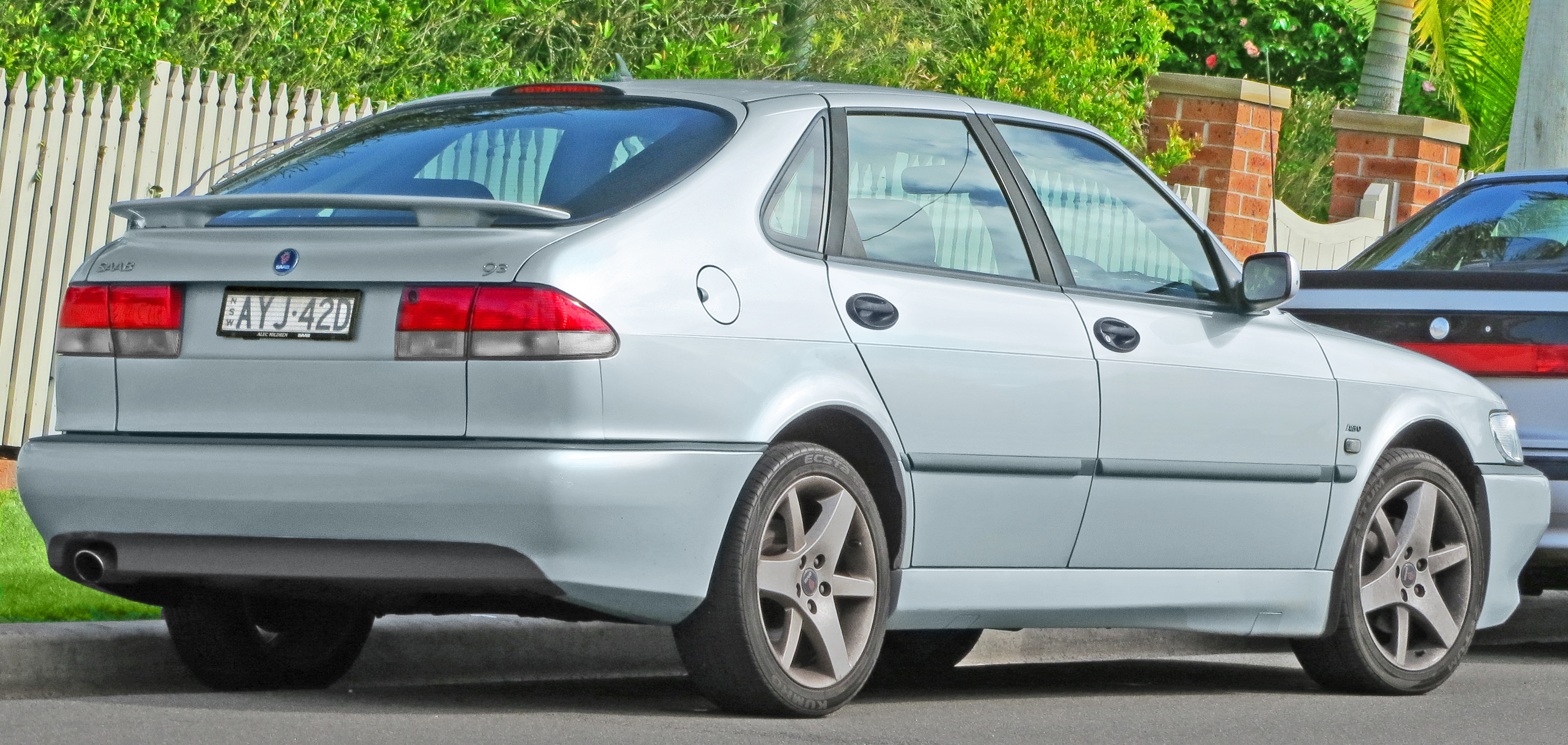
Saab 9-3 Aero 5-door (Australia)

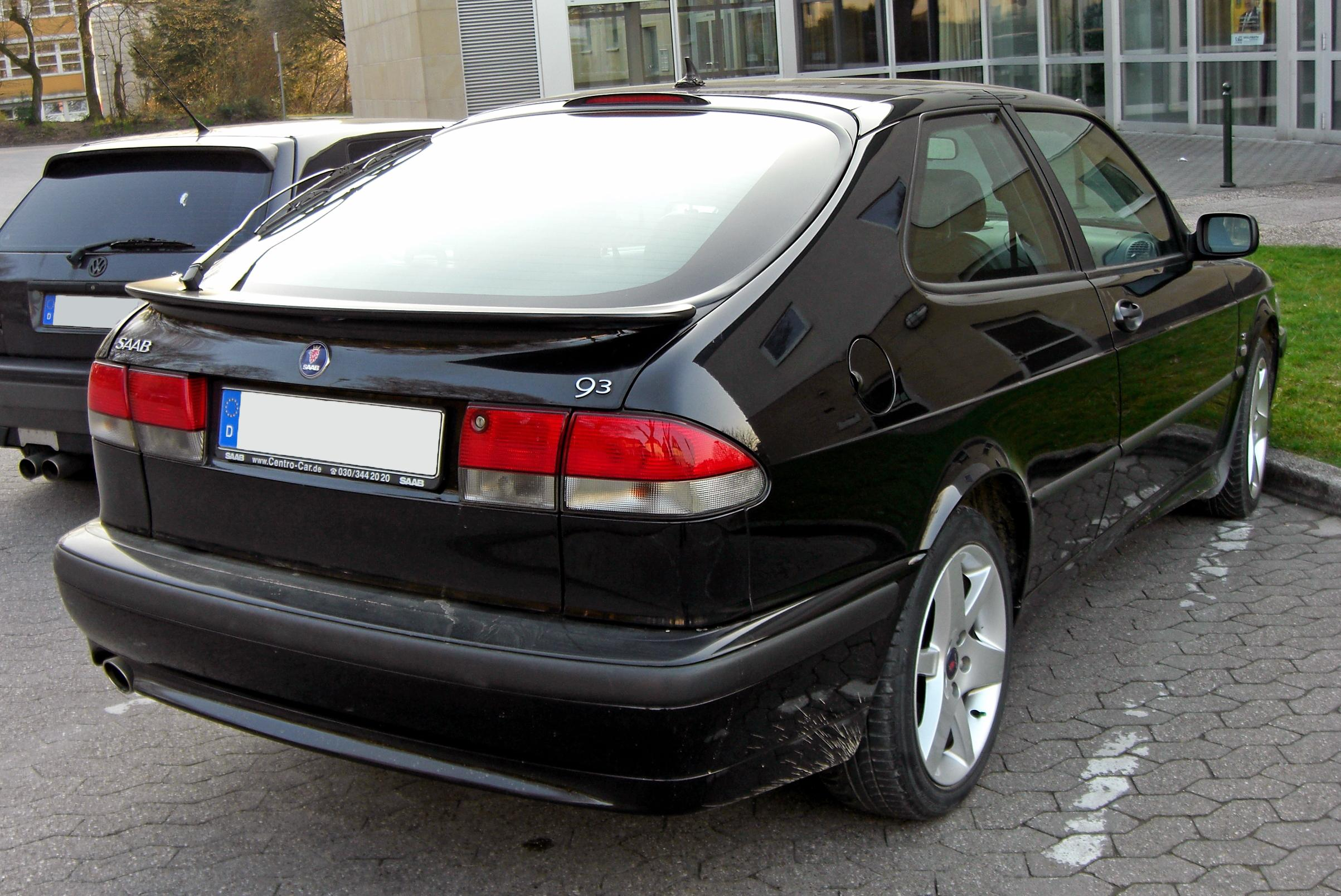
Saab 9-3 3-door (Europe)

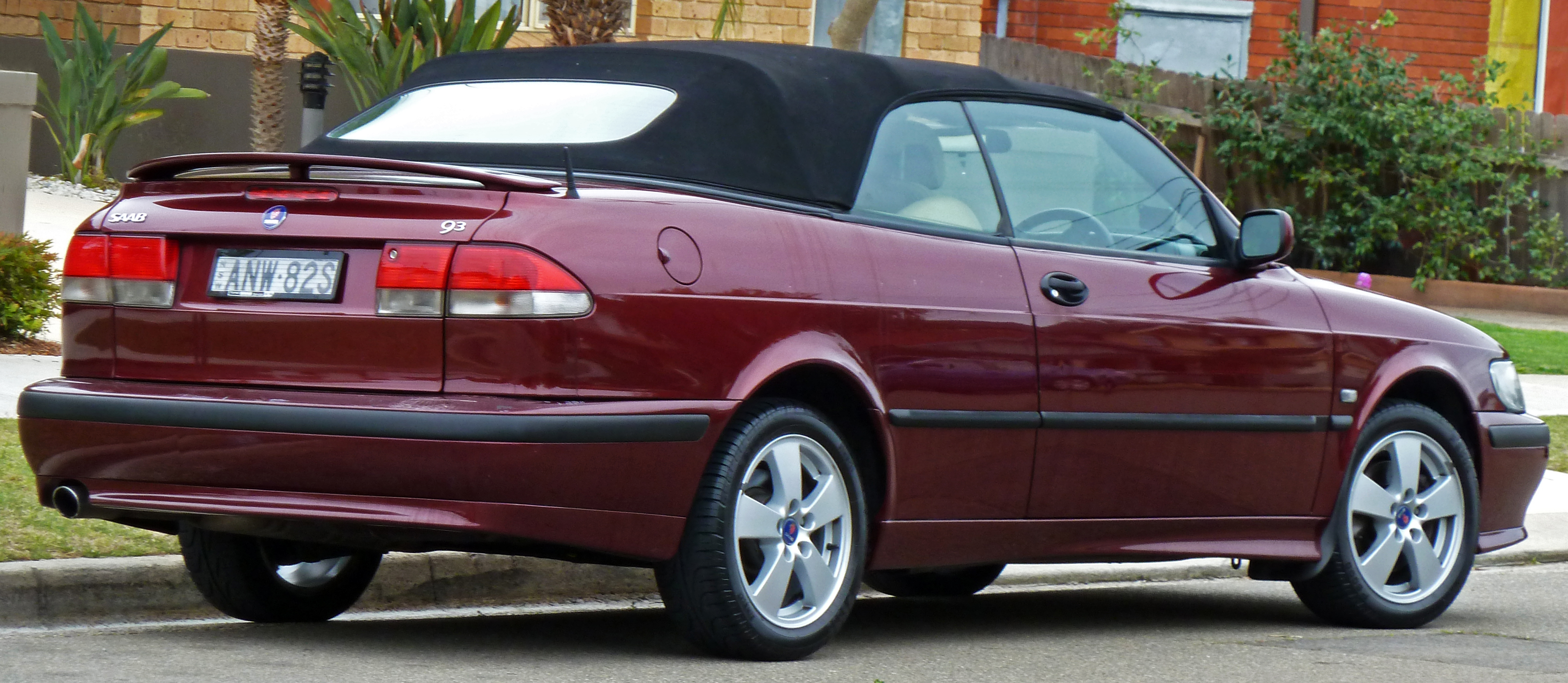
Saab 9-3 Anniversary convertible (Australia)

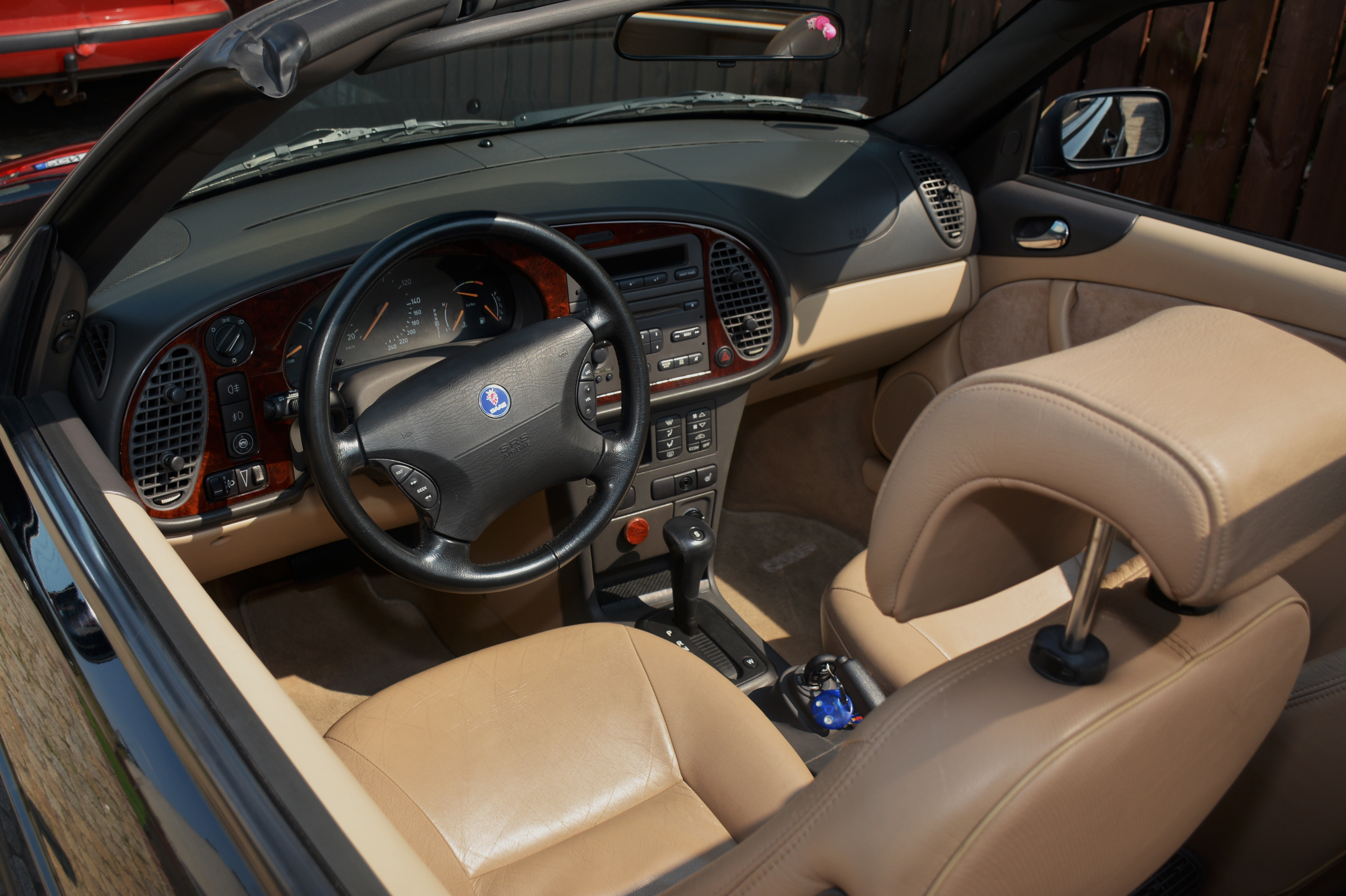
2001 Saab 9-3 convertible interior

The first generation 9-3, an updated Saab 900 (NG), was launched in 1998 for the 1999 model year. It is sometimes referred to as the 'OG' (old generation) 9-3 and internally as body style 9400. Production ended on 8 May 2002 at the Trollhättan plant and on 25 April 2003 at the Valmet plant in Finland.

Saab claimed that 1,100 changes were made between the outgoing NG 900 and the 9-3 such as revised suspension with more wheel travel and quicker steering. The 9-3 received revised styling with some models included a rear spoiler, while the underbody mounted 'snow & gravel flaps' were removed. It was available as a three or five-door hatchback, and as a two-door convertible. Further improvements over the Saab 900 (NG) included better crashworthiness courtesy of more extensive A-pillar reinforcements, stronger door sills and frames, redesigned and strengthened pendulum B pillars, standard dual stage torso/head side airbags, and Saab Active Head Restraints. Other changes included a bigger AC compressor, higher flow cabin ventilation system, a CAN bus based electrical architecture similar to the one in the 9-5, and a switch to a hydraulically operated convertible roof rather than an electric powered.

The 9-3 was available with a new variant of the B204 engine (B204E, 154 PS [113 kW; 152 bhp]), a low-pressure turbo (LPT) engine based on the B204L used in the last generation Saab 900. For the U.S. market, all 9-3s received turbocharged petrol engines with the "full pressure turbo" (B204L, 185 PS [136 kW; 182 bhp]) as the standard offering, and a "HOT" (B204R, 200 hp) variant in the SE models for the 1999 model year. The 2000 model year saw a revision from SAAB's Trionic T5.5 to Trionic 7 engine management system. The T7 based engines were the B205E, the B205L with 185 PS (136 kW; 182 bhp) and the B205R HOT engine with 205 PS (151 kW; 202 bhp). The first generation 9-3 was also the first Saab available with a diesel engine, a unit also found in the Opel Vectra, Astra G, Signum, and Zafira A.

A Saab innovation is the 'Night Panel', carried over from the Saab 900, which permits dousing of the instrument panel lighting, except for essential information, for less distraction when night driving.

A total of 326,370 first-generation 9-3s were built. As with the preceding generation, convertibles were built by Valmet in Uusikaupunki, Finland. Valmet was also the only plant assembling the 9-3 Viggen, in all three body styles. After production at Saab's main plant ended, Valmet kept producing non-Viggen hatchbacks until 2003. Altogether, Valmet built 7789 Hatchbacks of all models.

=== Saab 9-3 Viggen ===
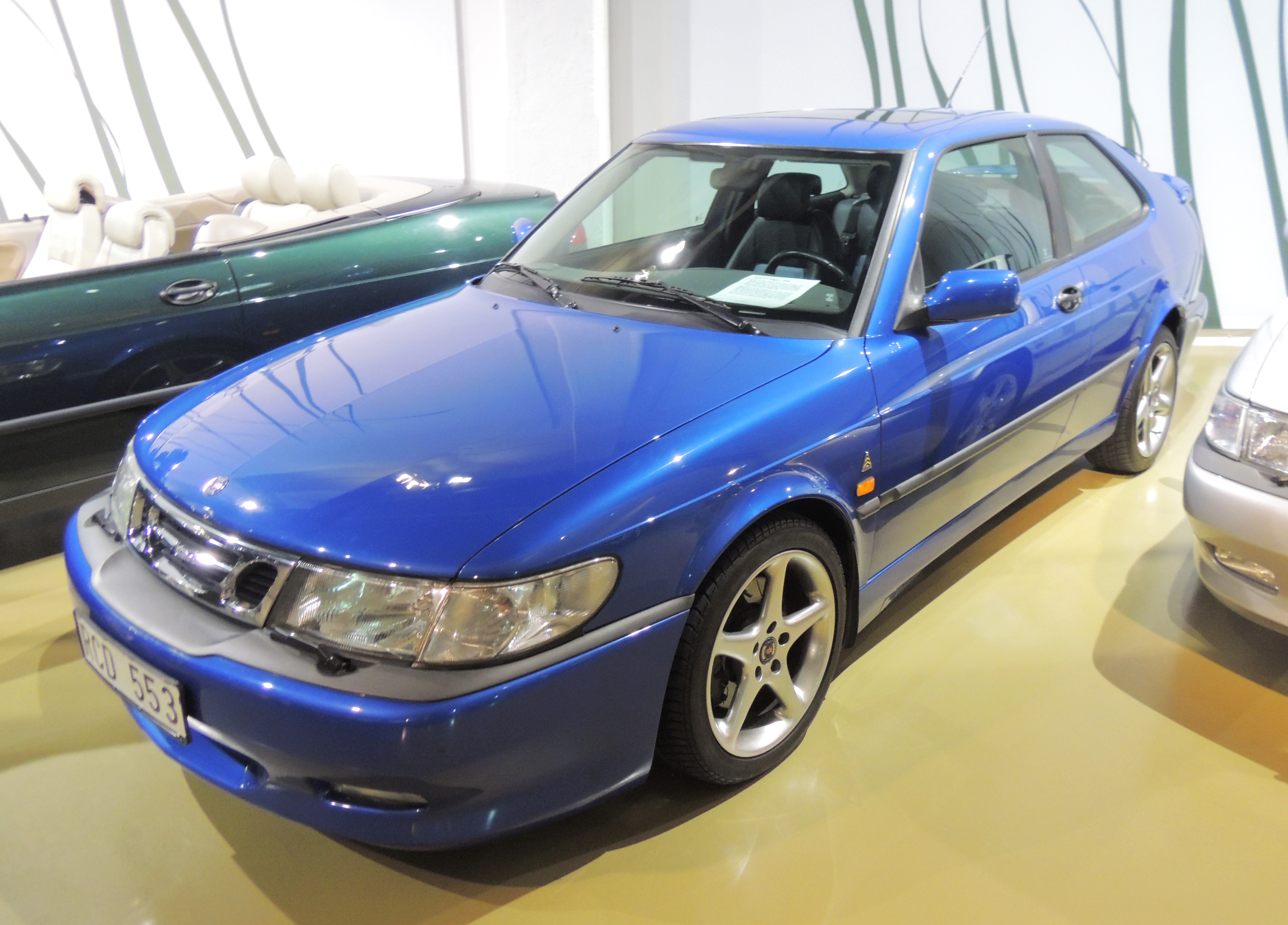
Saab 9-3 Viggen

Between 1999 and 2002, Saab offered a limited edition and higher-performance version of the 9-3. The 'Viggen' (English: Thunderbolt) is named after the Saab 37 Viggen aircraft, and was developed by Saab with input from the Tom Walkinshaw Racing (TWR) Group.

The Viggen production car draws upon the earlier 230 bhp (172 kW; 233 PS) Saab 900 Concept Coupe that had been developed by the Saab Special Vehicle Operations (SVO) group. For Saab, the team was led by Peter Leonard and John-Gustav Gudmundsson. Only 4,600 9-3 Viggen specification cars were produced.

==== Mechanical features ====
The Viggen is powered by Saab's 2.3 L B235R engine, running at a 9.3:1 compression ratio and fitted with Nimonic valves. Initially rated at 225 PS (165 kW; 222 bhp), power later increased to 230 PS (169 kW; 227 bhp) on 1.0 bar (15 psi) of boost from its Mitsubishi TD04-HL15-5 turbocharger.

The cars are equipped with a higher capacity intercooler, performance-tuned ECU, flow-through muffler and tip, stiffer gearbox casing and stronger output shaft, a heavy-duty clutch and pressure plate, stiffened and lowered springs with revised spring rates, firmer dampers, as well as stronger CV joints and driveshafts.

The Viggen is only available with a five-speed manual transmission, which features an electronic torque-sensing function to prevent damage to the gearbox.

In 1999, the Viggen was the first 9-3 to use Saab's Trionic 7 engine management system. The 2001 model year introduced a Traction Control System (TCS). The TCS was later made available in the SE line.

==== Exterior and interior features ====
The exterior of the Viggen features a larger rear wing that also located the radio antenna to the rear of the roof, aerodynamically designed bumpers and side skirts, model-specific 17-inch alloy wheels, and upgraded brakes. Paint options include Black, Metallic Silver, Steel Grey, Monte Carlo Yellow, Laser Red, and the exclusive Viggen 'Lightning Blue'.

The interior offers special bolstered and coloured leather seats and door cards in four colours: black with black inserts ('Charcoal'), black with blue inserts ('Deep Blue'), black with orange inserts ('Flame Ochre'), and tan with tan inserts.

Other interior features include a CD player with four or six-speaker, amplifier and CD-changer options, power moonroof, and what were initially Viggen-specific motorized and heated leather seats with the Viggen delta logo embossed in the backrest. The Viggen seats later became available in the Aero model (U.S. market 'SE' model) without the embossed Viggen logo. Some colors feature carbon-fibre interior trim, offered between 1999 and the middle of the 2001 model year. Cars built afterward came with a less expensive printed grey pattern for the dash and standard trim.

Buyers of new Viggen models in the U.S. were offered two days of advanced driving instruction at Road Atlanta and an opportunity to dine with Saab USA executives from nearby Norcross, Georgia.

==== Production summary ====
A total of 4,600 Viggens were manufactured by Valmet Automotive in Finland until production ended in June 2002; of which 500 units were produced for the UK market. For 1999, 426 3-door Viggens were imported into the U.S.; of those 420 were blue, two were silver, two were Monte Carlo yellow, and two were black.

Viggen Production Summary
| Models produced | | Models imported into the U.S. | | | |
| Model Year | Yearly total | Total | Convertible | 3-door | 5-door |
|---|---|---|---|---|---|
| 1998 | 14 | | | | |
| 1999 | 1,099 | 426 | | 426 | |
| 2000 | 1,621 | 804 | 245 | 138 | 421 |
| 2001 | 1,251 | 1,152 | 738 | 129 | 285 |
| 2002 | 615 | 550 | 322 | 71 | 157 |
| Total | 4,600 | 2,932 | 1,305 | 764 | 863 |

==== Reception ====
Some journalists have criticised the Viggen, in particular for untamed torque steer in low gears, with Britain's Evo Magazine naming the car as one of its 10 worst cars ever tested. Other commentators, however, have named the Viggen a 'classic'. US reviewers at Motor Trend (writing in 2000) noted the crisp turn-in and grip on offer. Jalopnik named the Viggen "The Last Great True Saab".

=== First generation 9-3 engines ===
Saab H Engine with Saab Direct Ignition and Trionic Engine Management, Shown Here In Trionic 7 Trim.

All the petrol engines offered in the first generation 9-3 were versions of the Saab H engine. The Saab 9-5 and the first generation 9-3 were the last Saab cars to use this all-Saab DOHC 16-valve fuel injection design. The non-turbo models use a distributor that leads to each spark plug, while the turbocharged engines utilize Saab's Trionic engine management system with a Direct Ignition Module (or cassette) mounted at the top of the engine, directly connecting to the spark plugs. Trionic 5 was used on the B204 Engines, and Trionic 7 was introduced with the B2x5 Engines. The latter two technologies were migrated into other GM products during the ten years that GM controlled Saab. All of the engines, other than the normally aspirated version and the low-pressure turbo, had high specific power outputs. The B205R generated 102.5 horsepower (76.4 kW) per litre and 210 lb⋅ft (285 N⋅m) of torque.

Specifications
| Engine | Displacement | Power | Torque | Compression ratio | Boost pressure | Model Years Available |
|---|---|---|---|---|---|---|
| B204i: | 2.0L (1985cc) | 130 PS (96 kW; 128 hp) at 5500 rpm | 177 N⋅m (131 lb⋅ft) at 4300 rpm | 10.1:1 | N/A | 1999–2000 |
| B204E: | 2.0L (1985cc) | 154 PS (113 kW; 152 hp) at 5500 rpm | 219 N⋅m (162 lb⋅ft) at 3600 rpm | 9.2:1 | 0.40 bar (5.8 psi) | 1999–2000 |
| B204L: | 2.0L (1985cc) | 185 PS (136 kW; 182 hp) at 5500 rpm | 263 N⋅m (194 lb⋅ft) at 2100 rpm | 8.8:1 | 0.73 bar (10.6 psi) | 1999–2000 |
| B204R: | 2.0L (1985cc) | 200 PS (147 kW; 197 hp) at 5500 rpm | 280 N⋅m (207 lbf⋅ft) at 2200 rpm | 9.2:1 | 1.00 bar (14.5 psi) | 1999–2000 |
| B235R: | 2.3L (2290cc) | 230 PS (169 kW; 227 hp) at 5500 rpm | 350 N⋅m (258 lb⋅ft) at 2500 rpm | 9.3:1 | 1.08 bar (15.7 psi) | 1999–2002 |
| B205E: | 2.0L (1985cc) | 150 PS (110 kW; 148 hp) at 5500 rpm | 240 N⋅m (177 lbf⋅ft) at 1800 rpm | 9.2:1 | 0.40 bar (5.8 psi) | 2000–2002/3 |
| B205L: | 2.0L (1985cc) | 185 PS (136 kW; 182 hp) at 5500 rpm | 280 N⋅m (207 lbf⋅ft) at 1800 rpm | 9.2:1 | 0.8 bar (12 psi) | 2000–2002/3 |
| B205R: | 2.0L (1985cc) | 205 PS (151 kW; 202 hp) at 5500 rpm | 280 N⋅m (207 lbf⋅ft) at 2200 rpm | 8.8:1 | 1.00 bar (14.5 psi) | 2000–2002/3 |
| D223L: | 2.2L (2171cc) | 116 PS (85 kW; 114 hp) | 260 N⋅m (192 lbf⋅ft) at 1800 rpm | 19.5:1 | 0.90 bar (13.1 psi) | 1998 – Sept. 2000 |
| D223L: | 2.2L (2171cc) | 125 PS (92 kW; 123 hp) | 285 N⋅m (210 lbf⋅ft) at 1750 rpm | 18.5:1 | 0.90 bar (13.1 psi) | Sept. 2000 – Aug. 2002 |

Notes:

- Turbochargers used: B204E, B204L, B204R: Garrett T25; B205E & B205L: Garrett GT17; B205R & B235R: MHI TD04-HL15T with 5 cm? exhaust port.
- The primary differences between the B204E and the B204L are the use of a Boost Pressure Control Valve and the ECU tuning.
- The primary differences between the B204L and the B204R are with the intercooler and the ECU tuning.
- The primary differences between the B205L and the B205R are the upgrade to the TD04-HL15T turbo from the GT17 and the ECU tuning.
- B204L with automatic gearbox has 185 hp at 5500 rpm and 250 Nm at 1900 rpm
- B205R with automatic gearbox has 205 hp at 5750 rpm and 250 Nm at 1900 rpm.

== Second generation (2003–2014) ==
Second generation (YS3F)
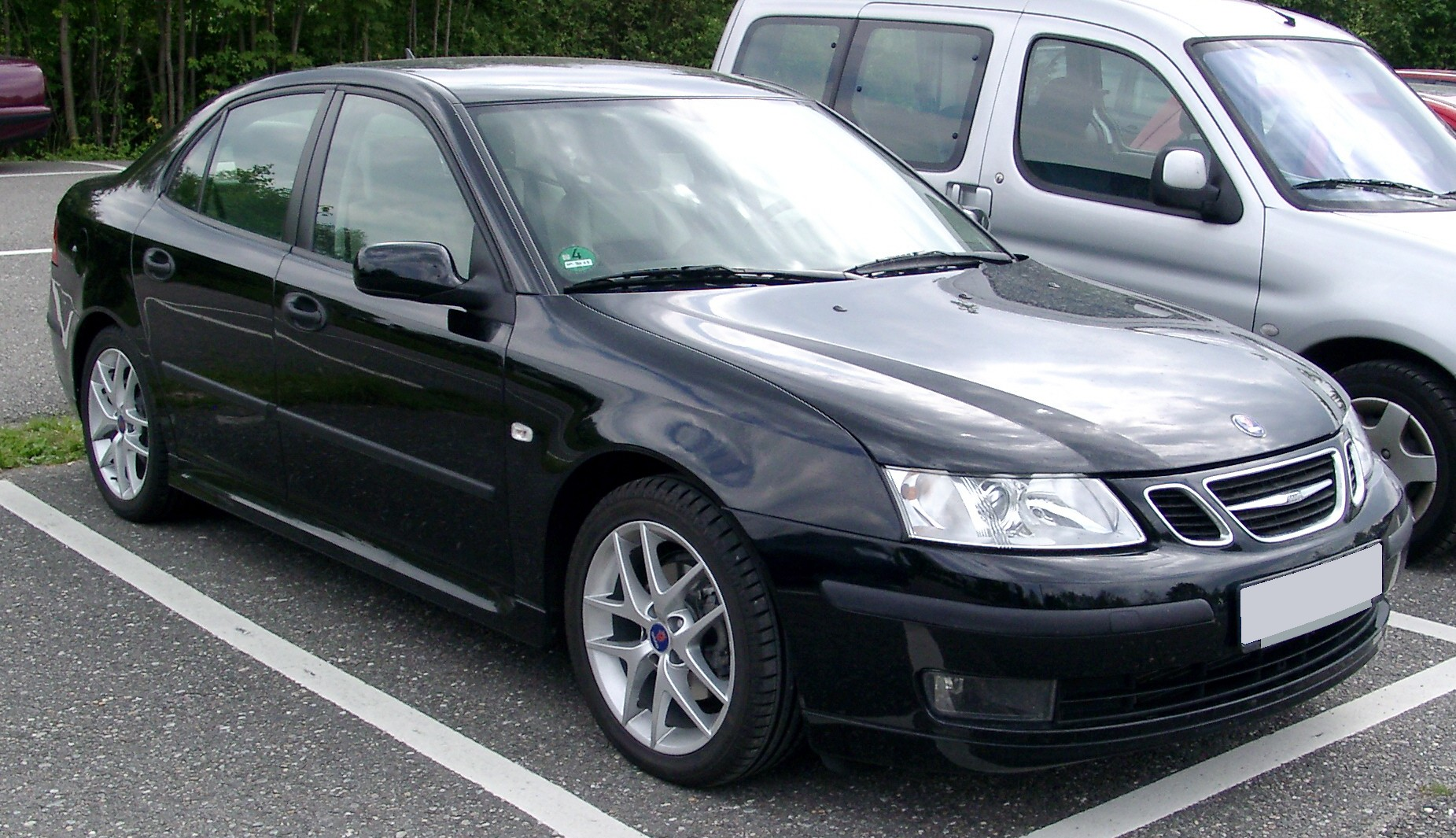

Overview
- Production: January 2002–2012; December 2013–2014
- Assembly: Sweden: Trollhättan (sedan; 2002–2011 and 2013–2014, wagon; 2005–2011 and convertible; 2010–2011); Sweden: Nyköping (ANA: convertible; 2012); Austria: Graz (Magna Steyr: convertible; 2003–2009)
- Designer: Michael Mauer, Einar Hareide, Anders Gustafsson

Body and chassis
- Body style: 2-door convertible 4-door sedan 5-door station wagon
- Layout: Front-engine, front-wheel drive / all-wheel drive
- Platform: GM Epsilon platform
- Related: Senova X65; Weiwang S50; Fiat Croma; Cadillac BLS; Opel Signum; Opel Vectra

Powertrain
- Engine: Petrol: 1.8 L Z18XE I4; 2.0 L B207E LP-turbo I4; 2.0 L B207L MP-turbo I4; 2.0 L B207R HP-turbo I4; 2.8 L B284 turbo V6; Diesel: 1.9 L Z19DT/DTH TiD I4; 1.9 L Z19DTR / A19DTR TTiD I4; 2.2 L D223L turbo I4
- Transmission: 5-speed F35 manual 6-speed F40 manual 5-speed Aisin AF33 automatic 6-speed Aisin AF40-6 automatic

Dimensions
- Wheelbase: 2,675 mm (105.3 in)
- Length: 2003–07: 4,633 mm (182.4 in) (convertible); 2003–07: 4,635 mm (182.5 in) (sedan); 2003–09: 4,653 mm (183.2 in) (wagon, Turbo X); 2008–09: 4,671 mm (183.9 in) (convertible); 2008–14: 4,647 mm (183.0 in) (sedan); 2010–14: 4,671–4,689 mm (183.9–184.6 in) (wagon)
- Width: 2008–09: 1,760 mm (69.3 in) (convertible); 2008–09: 1,753 mm (69.0 in) (sedan); 2010–14: 1,781 mm (70.1 in) (convertible); 2010–14: 1,801 mm (70.9 in); 1,763 mm (69.4 in) (Turbo X, wagon)
- Height: 2003–07: 1,433 mm (56.4 in) (convertible); 2003–07: 1,443 mm (56.8 in) (sedan); 2003–07: 1,540 mm (60.6 in) (wagon); 2008–14: 1,438 mm (56.6 in) (convertible); 2008–14: 1,450 mm (57.1 in) (sedan); 2008–14: 1,496 mm (58.9 in) (wagon, Turbo X); 2010–14: 1,529 mm (60.2 in) (wagon)
- Curb weight: 2008–09: 1,410–1,690 kg (3,109–3,726 lb)

The 9-3X concept, a preview of the next-generation 9-3, premiered in January 2002 at the North American International Auto Show. Originally, the 9-3 was due to début with the Opel Vectra in October 2001, at the Frankfurt Motor Show, but in July 2001, it was announced that delays had forced General Motors to postpone the introduction. The new 9-3 was eventually launched in July 2002 for the 2003 model year. The convertible version of the second-generation 9-3 began with the MY04, and SportCombi with MY06.

The new 9-3 remained an exclusively front-wheel drive powertrain at launch. The most significant aesthetic change from the previous generation cars was the elimination of the hatchback design. The second-generation 9-3 was available as a four-door saloon, an estate (introduced in late 2005 as a 2006 model, known as the SportWagon, SportCombi, or Sport-Hatch depending on the market), and a two-door convertible (introduced in 2004). It included Saab Active Head Restraints (SAHR II) to reduce whiplash and ReAxs, a feature of the rear suspension bushings which changes the toe angle to help reduce understeer under heavy braking.

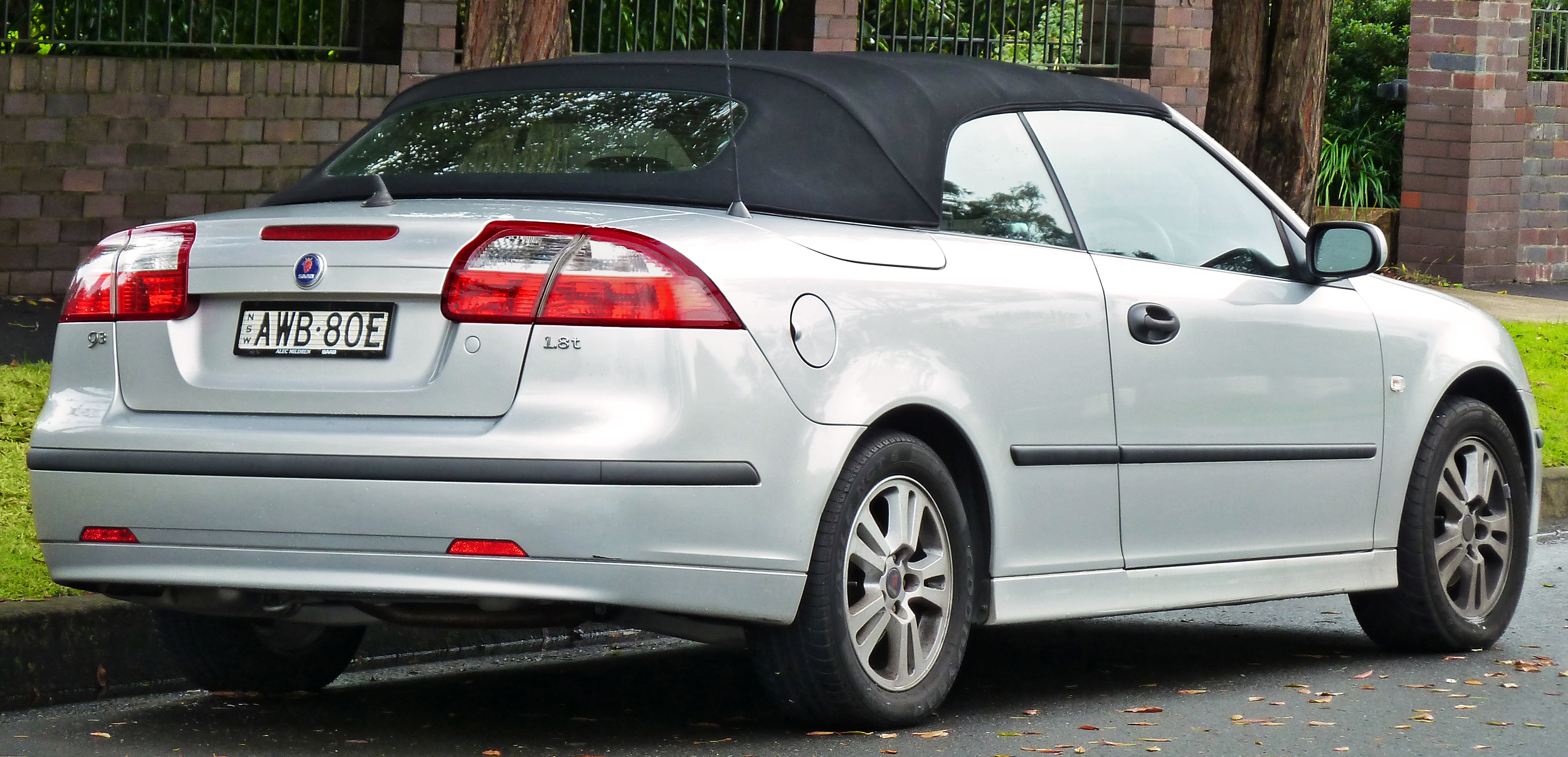
Saab 9-3 Linear 1.8t convertible (pre-facelift), Australia

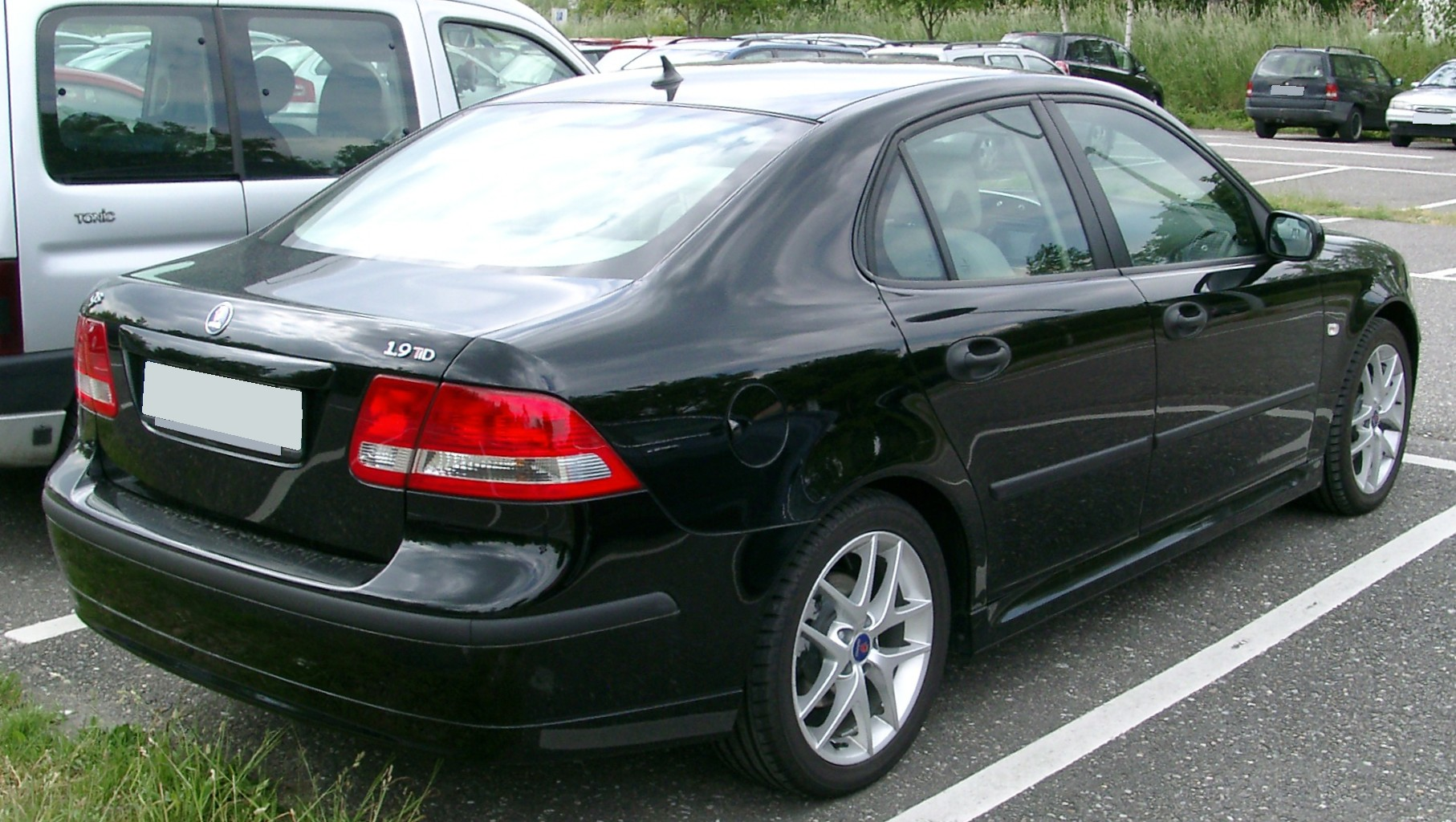
Saab 9-3 sedan (pre-facelift), Europe

The new 9-3 departed from the Saab H / EcoPower engine used previously for a new 2.0 L straight-four Ecotec engine from General Motors' for the petrol-powered models. There are three different versions of the turbocharged inline-four, with the amount of turbo boost determining the power output: 1.8t (112 kW), 2.0t (131 kW) and 2.0T (157 kW). The engines were mated with a 5-speed manual transmission or a 5-speed 'Sentronic' which is a traditional automatic, not to be confused with SAAB's earlier 'Sensonic' which was a clutchless manual transmission that retained a conventional H-pattern shifter, but the clutch system was hydraulically actuated. In 2003 models, the standard manual transmission was a 5-speed gearbox with the 6-speed optional. The 6-speed manual was standard on US 2.0T (Vector) models.

There were four trim levels: the entry-level Linear, mid-range Vector and Arc (with emphasis on sporty appeal and luxury), and a top-of-the-range Aero model. In non-US markets, any trim level except the Aero (which was exclusively available with the 210 hp 2.0T) was available with any engine the buyer opted for. However, in the US, the Linear was exclusively available with the 2.0t engine, the Arc and Vector trims were exclusively available with the 2.0T, and the Aero model offered more options, such as a sunroof, larger wheels, and a 6-speed manual while retaining the same engine as the 2.0T, the B207R. It would be given a 2.8 L turbocharged V6 in 2006. No diesel models were sold in the US, neither were the 1.8T nor any BioPower engines.

The 9-3 and the Opel Vectra were the first of the global GM Epsilon platform, which was then lengthened to accommodate four new cousins, the Chevrolet Malibu/Malibu Maxx, the Pontiac G6, and the Saturn Aura. A proprietary fiber-optic electric/electronic system, the possibility of AWD (exploited from 2008 on, dubbed Saab XWD), and ReAxs were features exclusive to the 9-3.

On 22 February 2012, the last of final 47 Saabs were built. All those cars were 9-3 Cabriolets and 37 where 'Independence Edition' convertible models all of them where assembled by one of Sweden's largest car dealers, ANA, in Trollhättan. Of the 47 cars assembled, 21 were LHD, and 26 RHD. The final Saab was a Saab 9-3 Aero Independence Edition TTiD convertible.

=== 2004 ===
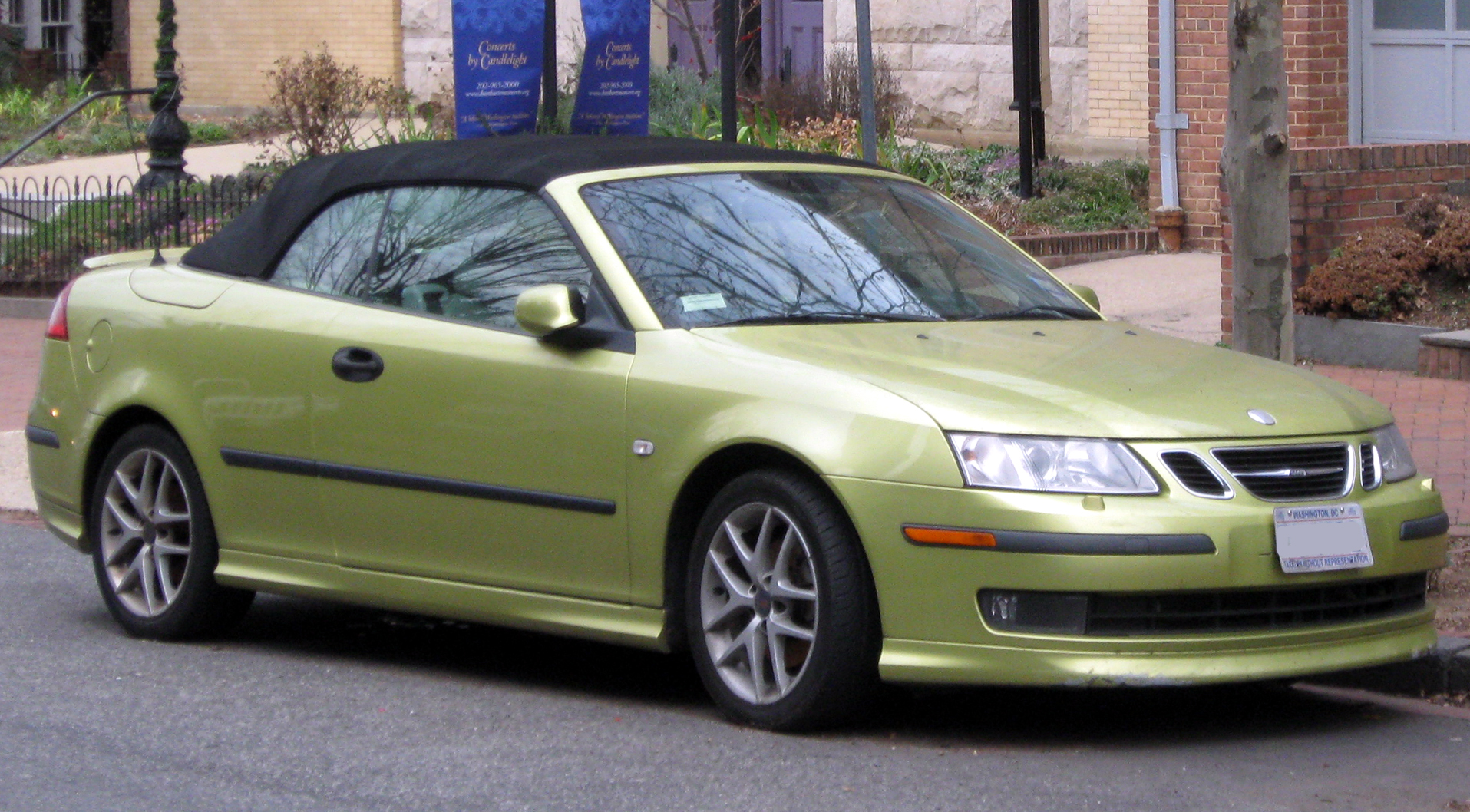
2004–2007 Saab 9-3 convertible (US)

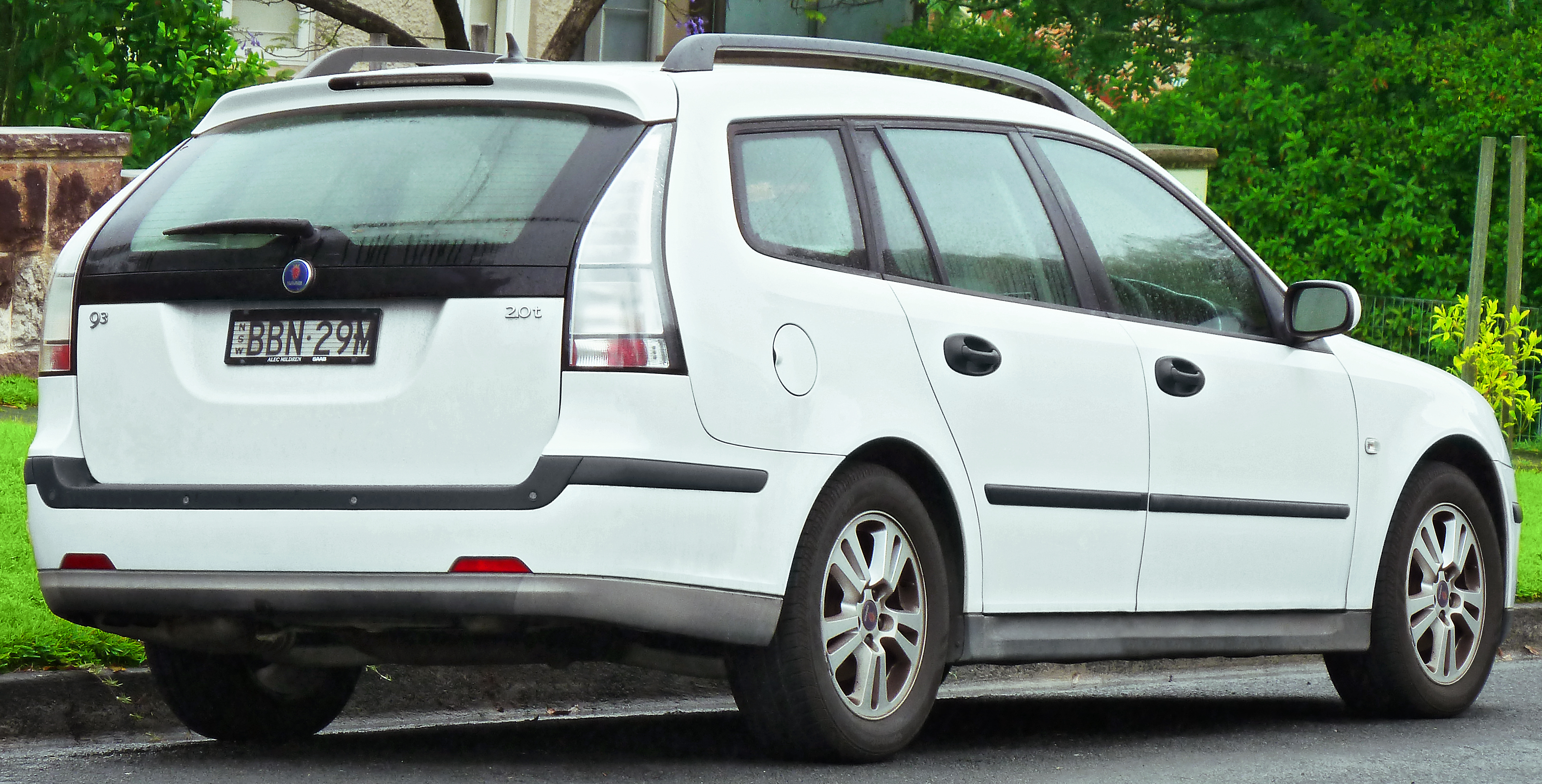
9-3 SportCombi

The Vector trim level was replaced with the Aero in the United States. The Arc trim level received the five-speed manual in place of the six-speed. In the UK, the 9-3 Aero 2.0T was made available with a six-speed manual transmission.

=== 2005 ===
The 2.2 TiD engine was replaced with the common rail 1.9 TiD engine, sourced from Fiat. The 1.9 TiD was available both as an 8-valve version with 120 PS and a 16-valve version with 150 PS. The 8V version was available exclusively with a 6-speed manual, while the 16V was also available with a 6-speed automatic. The 16V was equipped with a diesel particulate filter as standard, while it was optional on the 8V for the 2005 MY. Like the 2.2 TiD, the 1.9 TiD was not available in the US.

US versions were sold with 16-inch wheels standard (17-inch for the Aero), unlike the 15-inch wheels which were previously found in the Linear version. In the United States, but not in most countries, 2005 was the last year of the Linear and Arc versions. In addition, the 6-speed manual was dropped and both the Arc and Aero received the 5-speed manual.

=== 2006 ===
A new 2.8-liter turbocharged V6 engine, branded as 2.8T by Saab, was introduced for the Aero. The 2006 Aero was exclusively available with the V6 in the US, replacing the 2.0T engine. In other markets, the 2006 Aero was available with both the four-cylinder 2.0T and the 6-cylinder 2.8T engine. The 2.0T had 12.3 psi maximum turbo boost pressure and produced 210 hp (157 kW), while the 2.8T had 8.7 psi of boost and produced 250 hp (186 kW). In certain markets, like Switzerland, a 230 hp variant of the 6-cylinder was also offered in Vector trim.

In the United States, the Linear model and the 175 hp engine was dropped, thus all four-cylinder 9-3 models had the 210 hp engine. The Arc designation was discontinued, and replaced by a trim level called 2.0T, which was similar to the 2005 Arc except that Linear wheels were used. A "20 Years Edition Aero Convertible" for the American market was unveiled at the Los Angeles Auto Show in January 2006 to celebrate 20 years since the introduction of the Saab 900 convertible. All of these models were finished in metallic electric blue.

=== 2007 ===
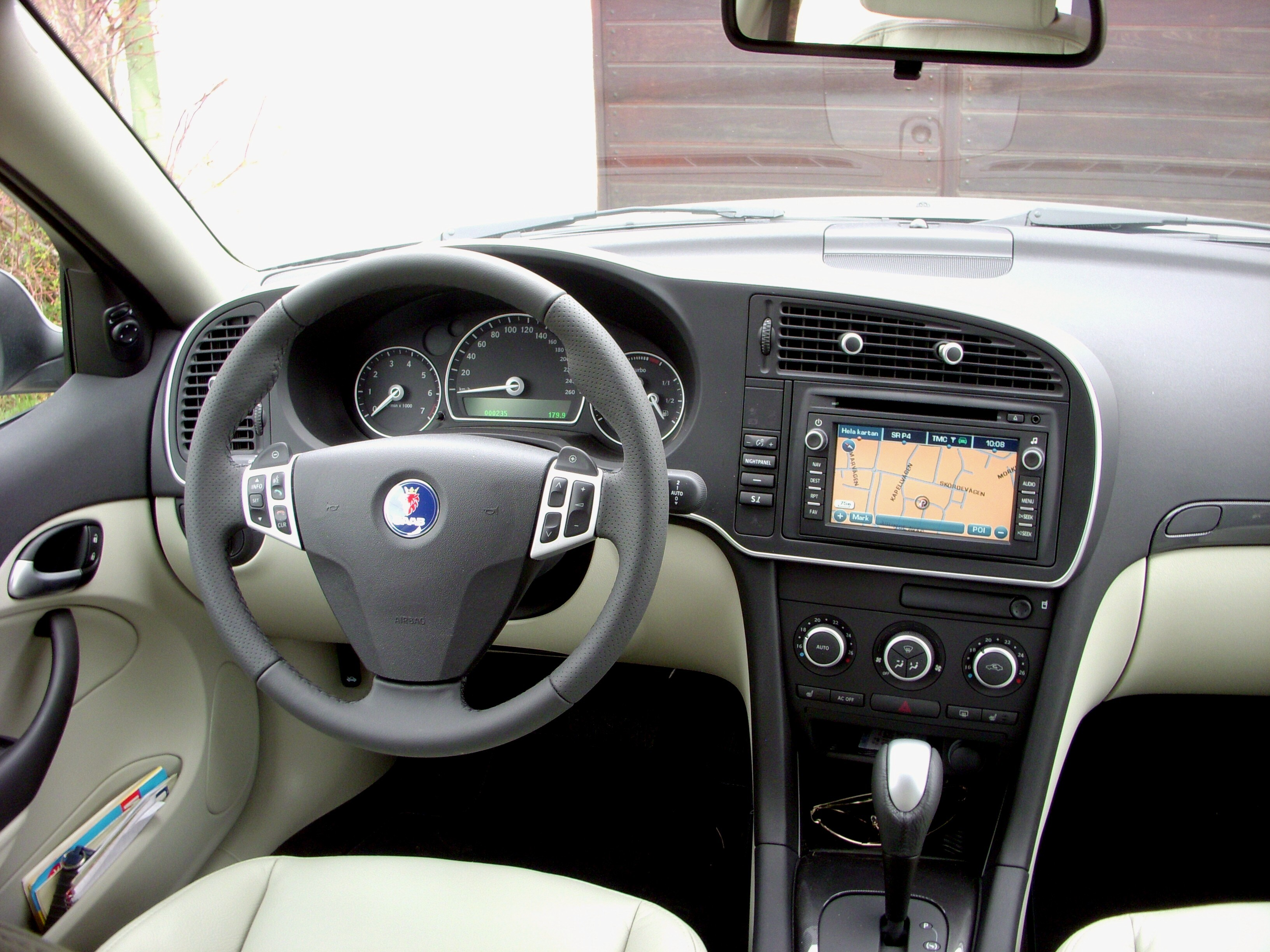
9-3 updated interior

The dashboard was revamped for 2007, with the Saab Information Display moved from its high-mounted position to the main instrument binnacle. The button-heavy climate control system was discontinued and replaced by the Saab 9-5 system, OnStar was re-introduced and required when Nav was ordered in North America, and the corporate GM head unit debuted, which allowed for satellite radio and MP3 CD capability. Steel Gray was also replaced with Titan Gray as an exterior color choice. For the 2007 model year, the 9-3 was also available with Biopower versions of the 1.8t and 2.0t engines, able to run on E85 as well as petrol.

In the U.S. market, only the 210 hp 2.0 L 16-valve turbo engine and the 250 hp 2.8 L V6 turbo were available. The manual transmission in the 2.0T model was changed from a 5-speed to a 6-speed.

A 60th Anniversary Edition was also offered for the sedan, wagon, and convertible body styles for 2007 to celebrate 60 years of SAAB. The package was available on 2.0T cars. It included unique five-spoke 17-inch alloy wheels, black leather sport seats with grey inserts and SAAB embossments on the front seats, dark walnut trim, black floormats with grey binding, front fog lamps, and a BOSE audio system with 6-disc CD changer and satellite radio. Sedan and convertible models also received trunk-lid spoilers. An Ice Blue metallic paint was offered for the edition, as well as standard SAAB paint colors.

=== 2008 facelift ===
Saab claimed over 2,000 changes were made to the model year 2008 cars. Introduced at the Saab Festival in Trollhättan, Sweden on 10 June 2007, the 2008 models included new frontal styling inspired by the Saab Aero-X and Saab 9-2X, Saab's first use of LED "signature" lighting in the revised headlamps, new door panels, a new clamshell bonnet, new rear bumper, and clear tail lamps, dubbed "ice block". Black replaced charcoal gray as an interior color choice. Snow Silver became a new exterior color. The 2.8T V6 received a mild output boost from 250 to 255 PS (184 to 188 kW; 247 to 252 bhp). Some additional exterior modifications are available on the limited-edition XWD, 280 PS (206 kW; 276 bhp) 9-3 Turbo X, presented at the Frankfurt Motor Show (9/07). The Turbo X made its North American debut at the New England Auto show in late November. Saab also released an all-wheel-drive version of the Aero, with the system dubbed "XWD", in March 2008.

A new twin-turbo diesel engine with 180 PS, dubbed 1.9 TTiD, was introduced. The TTiD engine was also available in Aero trim. The TTiD Aero marked the first time Saab had used a diesel engine in a car with the Aero designation.

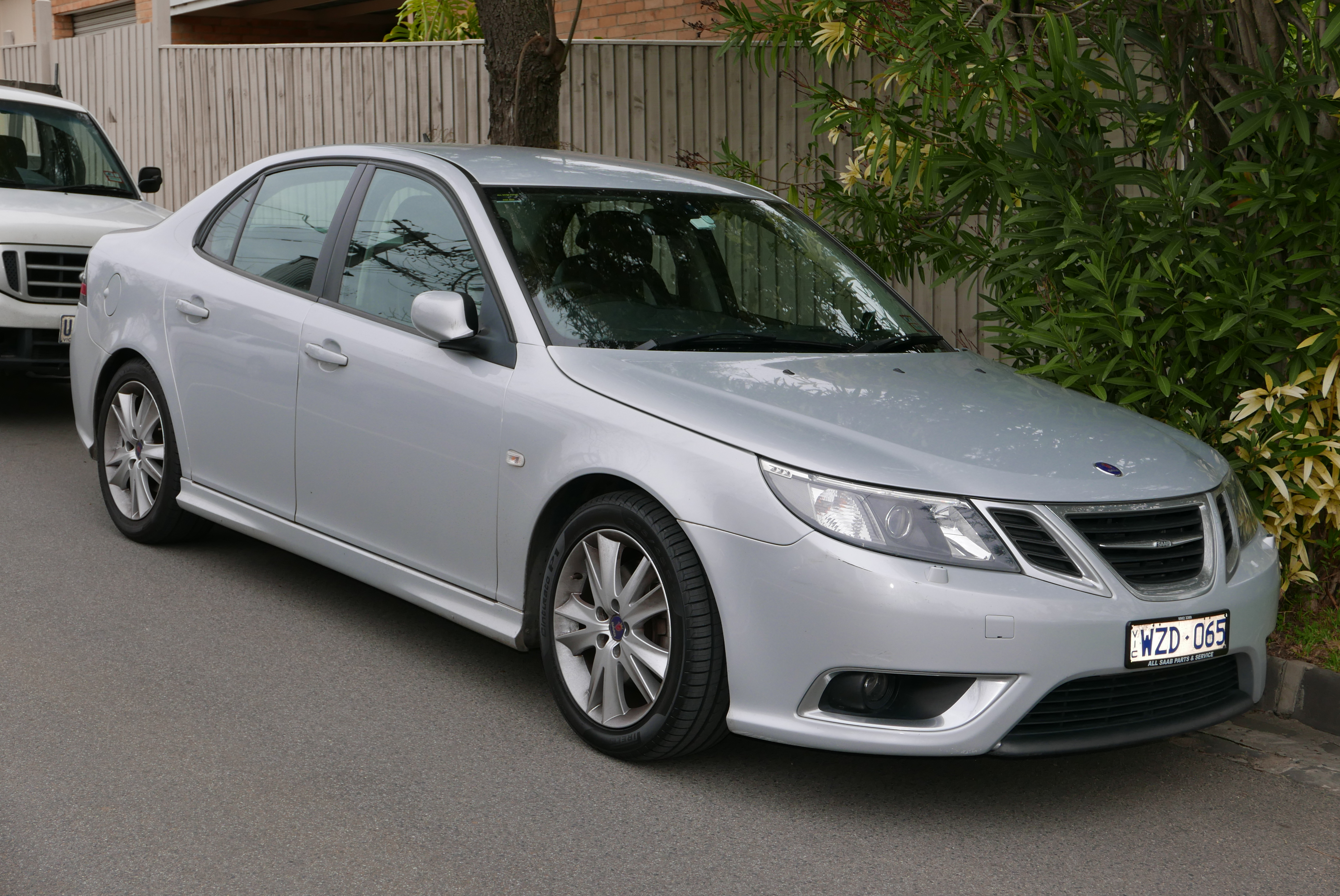
2009 (MY08) Saab 9-3 Aero 2.8T SportSedan

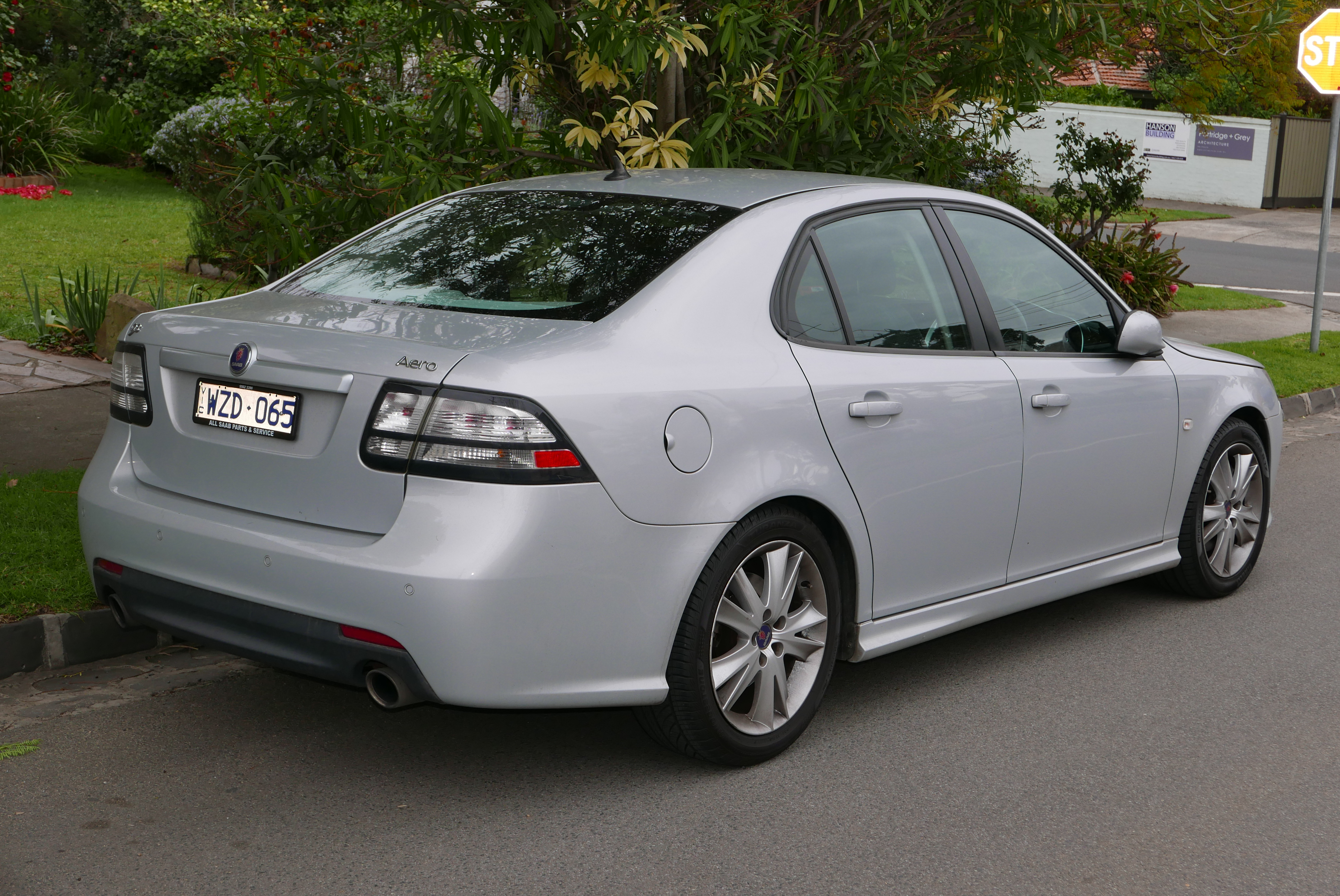
Rear view

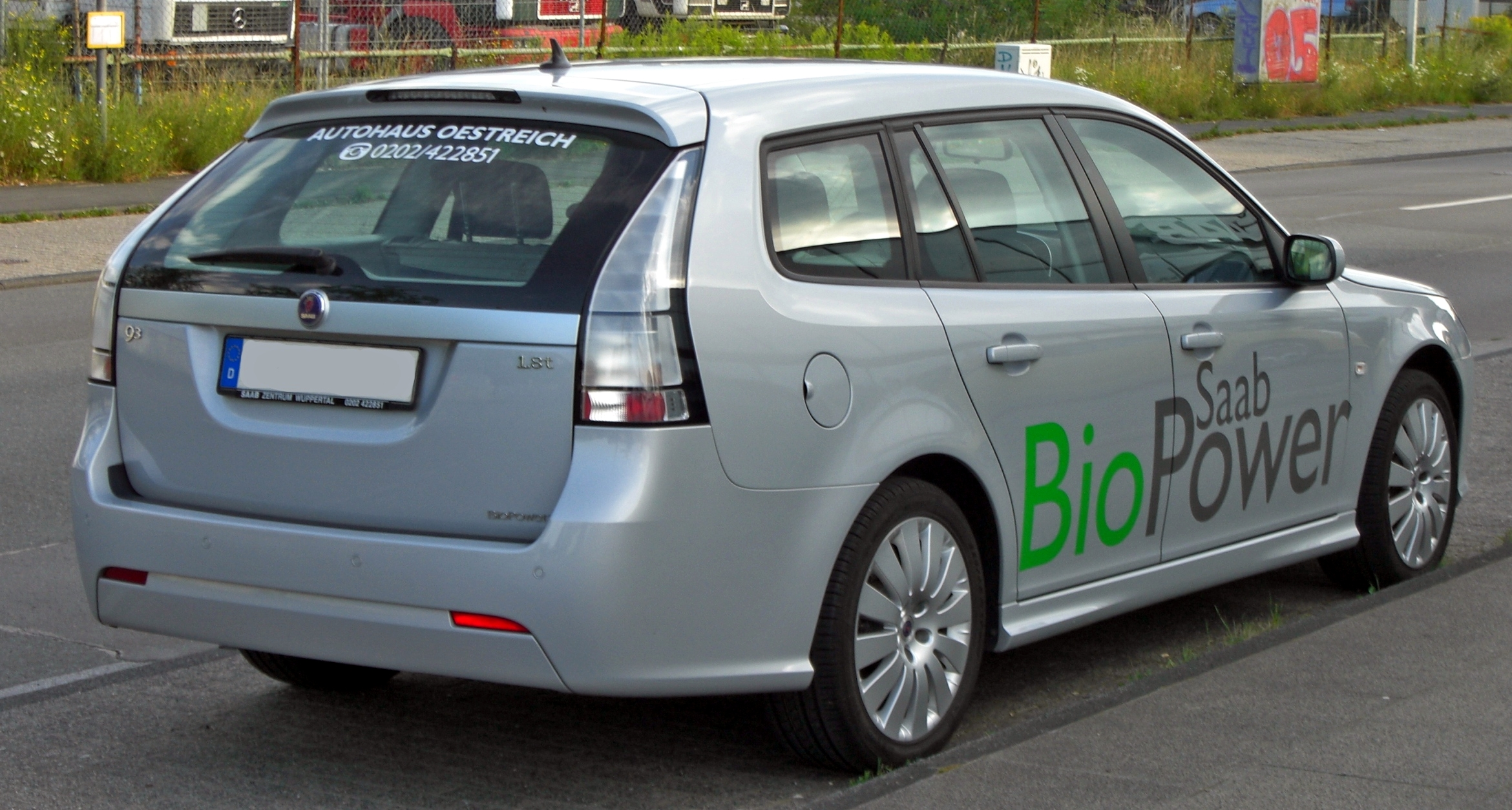
2008 (MY08) Saab 9-3 BioPower 1.8T SportCombi

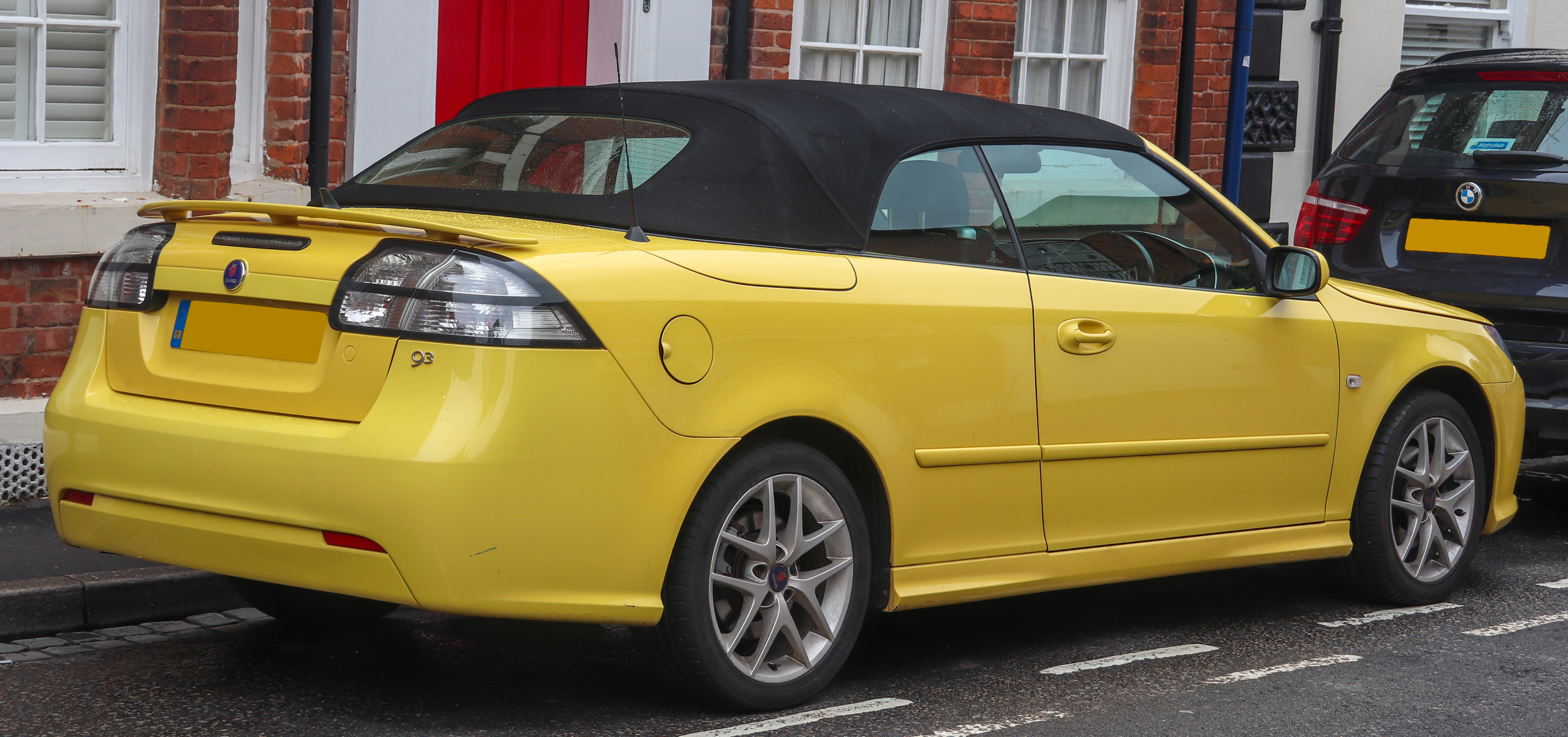
2008 (MY08) Saab 9-3 Vector 1.9T convertible

=== Saab Turbo X ===
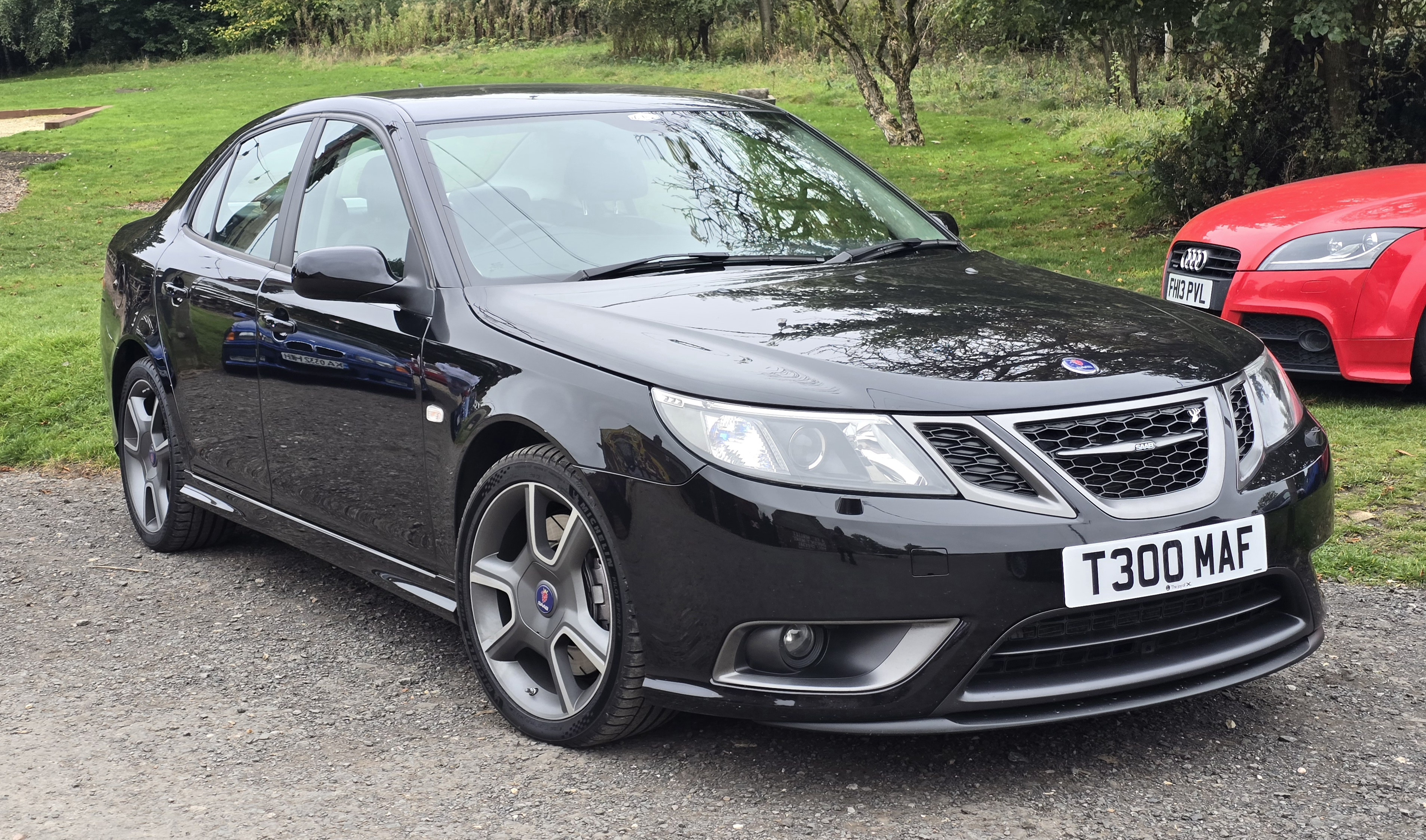
2008 Saab 9-3 Turbo X

Offered in either Sport Sedan, or Sportcombi (wagon) body styles, the Turbo X was made to celebrate Saab's 30 years of turbocharging. All Turbo X models were offered in metallic jet black with matte grey trim. The Turbo X is Saab's first production car with the XWD all-wheel drive system from Haldex Traction and eLSD. It is powered by a 2.8 L V6 producing 280 PS (206 kW), mated to a six-speed manual or automatic gearbox. It has larger brakes as well as stiffer springs and shocks. The dash, shift lever, and door panels have a carbon fiber look, and the turbo boost gauge draws its inspiration from the Saab 900.

=== 2009 ===
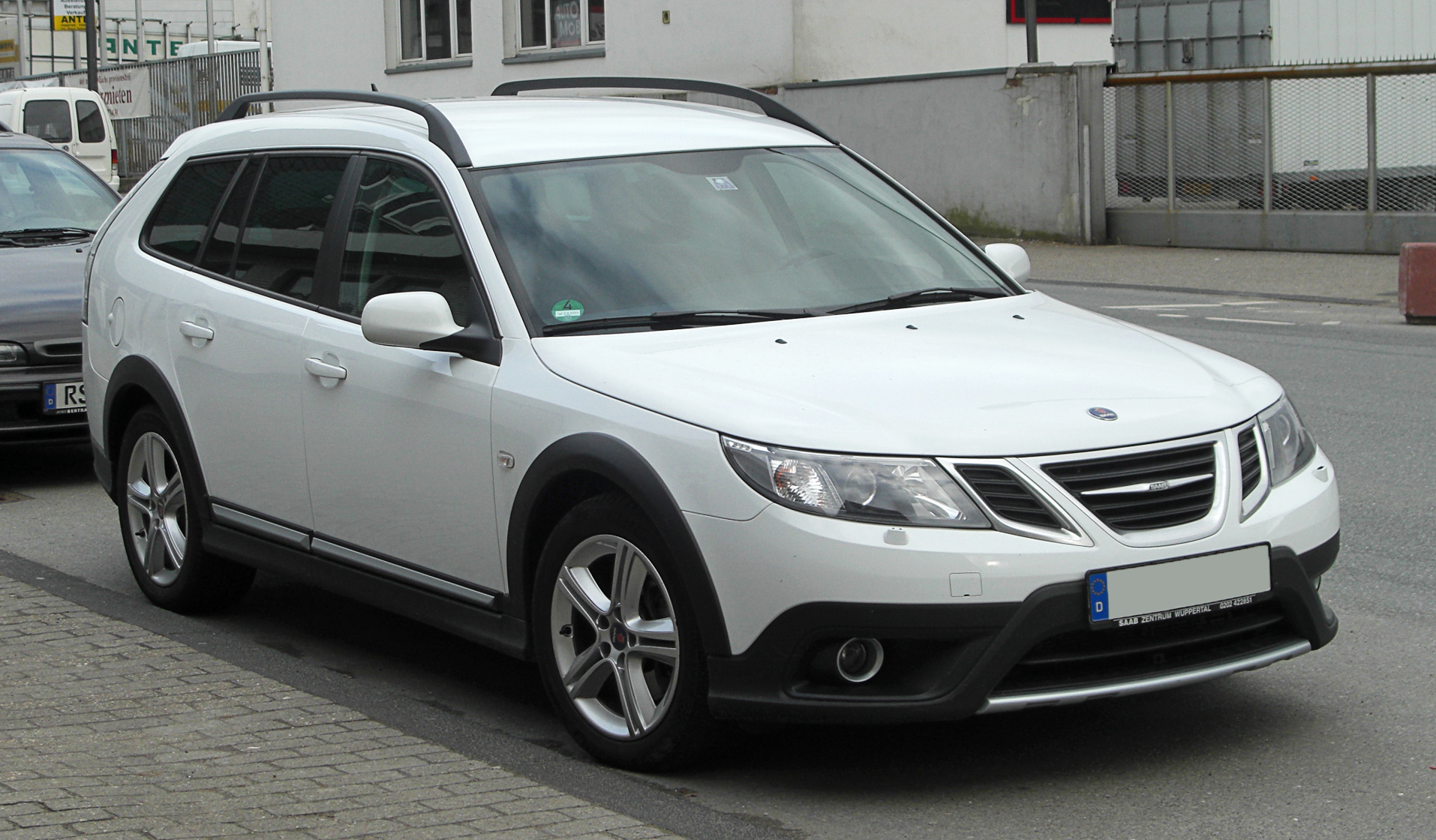
2009 Saab 9-3X

The 2009 9-3 series expanded the trim levels while dropping the limited-edition Turbo X saloon and estate from the lineup. The 2.0T and Aero saloon and estate models were now available with Saab's all-wheel drive (XWD). The convertible range lacked the all-wheel-drive option. The 2009 9-3 was mostly unchanged from the 2008 model, although the Aero trim level came standard with the XWD system, eLSD, and 280-horsepower power increase, all formerly reserved for the discontinued Turbo X. In 2009, the 9-3X was launched at the Geneva Auto Show. The 9-3X is a four-wheel-drive XUV version of the 9-3 SportWagon. The new 9-3X came with two engine choices: the 1.9 L diesel (producing 180 bhp) and the 2.0 L petrol engine (producing 210 bhp). Only the 2.0 L petrol engine is equipped with the XWD, while the diesel version is available only with front-wheel-drive.

=== 2010 ===
For 2010, the Saab 9-3 Aero's turbocharged V6 was eliminated. All models used the 2.0-liter turbo-4.

=== Saab 9-3 Aero Carlsson ===
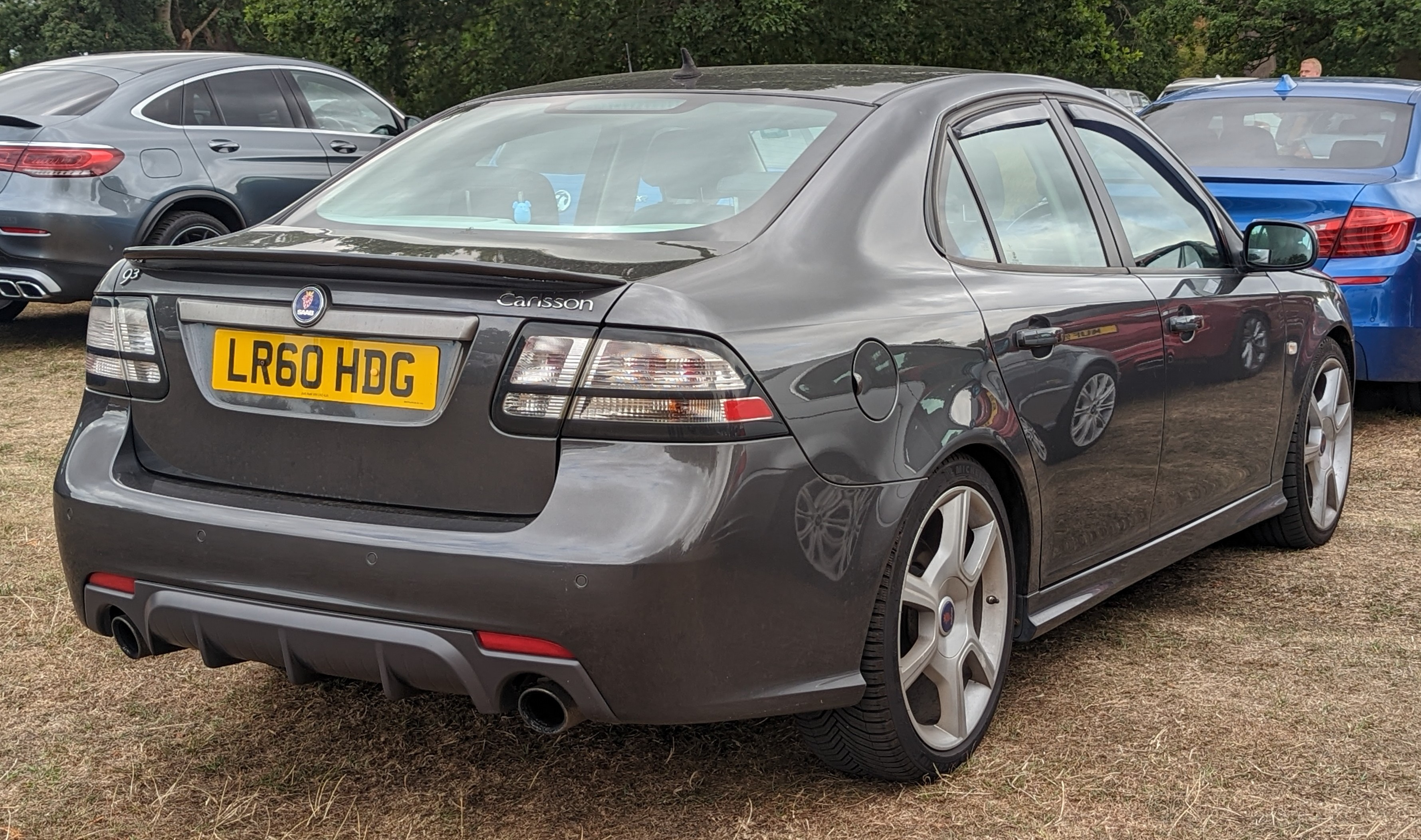
2010 Saab 9-3 Aero Carlsson

2010 marked the 50th anniversary of Erik Carlsson's first win for Saab on the RAC Rally in a Saab 96. A total of 96 Aero Carlsson 9-3s were built. The 9-3 Aero Carlsson featured Saab's cross wheel drive (XWD) system, and a turbocharged 2.8 L V6 producing 280 PS (206 kW), and 400 N⋅m (295 lb⋅ft) of torque through a 6-speed "Sentronic" hydraulic automatic transmission. It could accelerate from 0-60 mph (97 km/h) in 6.9 seconds, and from 50-70 mph in 6.3 seconds.

=== Saab 9-3 ePower ===
The Saab 9-3 ePower electric car was unveiled at the 2010 Paris Motor Show as Saab's electric vehicle. The concept car is based on the 9-3 SportWagon, has a 35.5 kWh lithium-ion battery pack, a top speed of 150 km/h (93 mph), and an estimated driving range of 200 km (120 mi). Saab had scheduled to run a two-year trial with 70 ePower demonstrators in Sweden by late 2011. The new owner of the Saab estate, National Electric Vehicle Sweden, initially stated that they intended to start producing the all-electric 9-3 ePower to be launched in China by late 2013 or early 2014.

The production version was slated to be unveiled at the 2014 Frankfurt Motor Show and market launch for 2015. In April 2014, NEVS began production on a batch of 200 units to be tested in Qingdao, China by mid-2014. After the test, sales were scheduled to begin in Sweden in 2015.

=== 2011 ===
For the 2011 model year, the single-turbo TiD diesel engines were replaced by twin-turbo diesel engines (TTiD), which increased the power output of the 8V version from 120 to 130 PS, and the 16V from 150 to 160, respectively.

=== 2012 ===
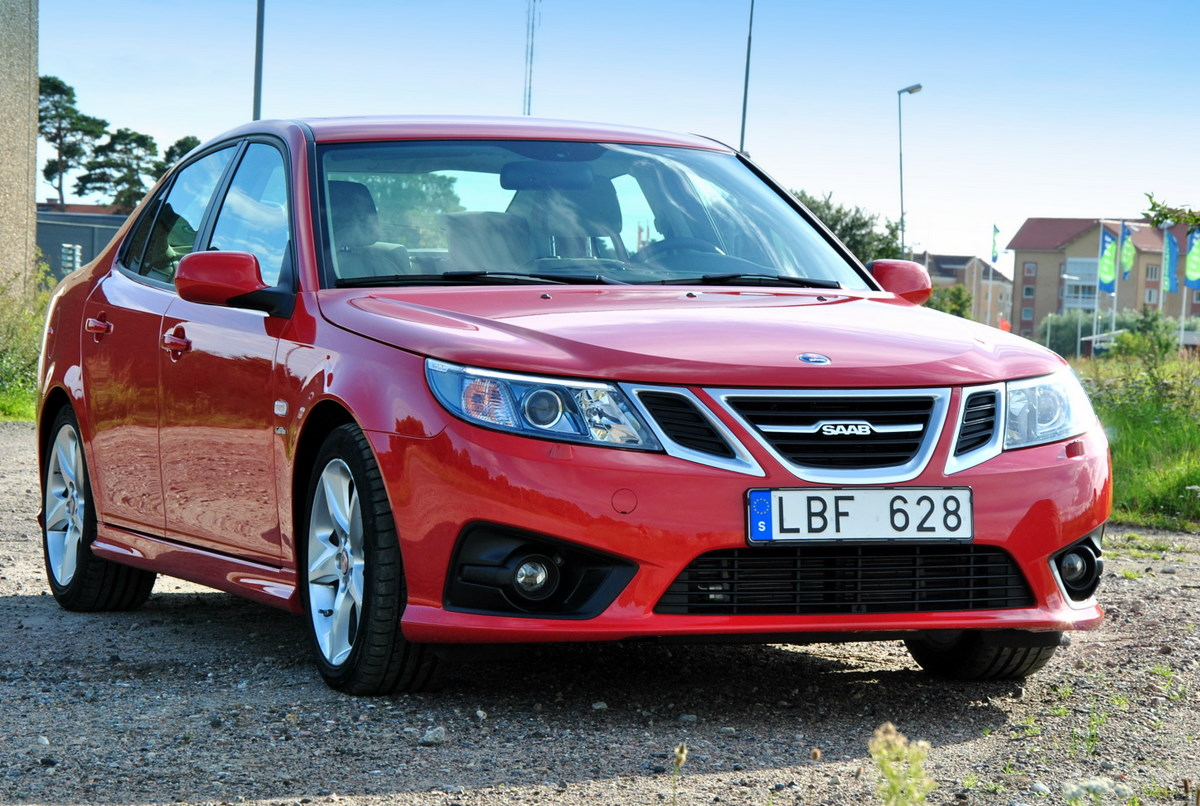
2012 revised version and facelifted Saab 9-3 Griffin (Saloon)

The 9-3 received some revisions in 2011 for the 2012 model year. Changes were in the engine range with an overall reduction in diesel and petrol engine fuel consumption of 12% and 7% respectively. An entry-level 163 hp, 2.0 L gasoline/BioPower engine was added for 9-3 saloon, estate, and 9-3X models with Saab XWD. Other changes included rear badging in line with the new Saab 9-5 saloon, 'ice block' style headlights, a new front bumper design, titanium metallic-effect trim around the instrument panel, gearshift, doors, and glove box. The Aero included a graphite fiber effect and contrast stitching on leather upholstery.

In most markets, the car was badged 'Griffin'. The three-spoke alloy wheel returned in 16- to 18-inch choices. An "Independence Edition" convertible was released with a total of 366 units to be built to commemorate the first anniversary of the sale to Spyker Cars. Only 37 of those were completed.

=== Safety ===
ANCAP test results* Saab 9-3 (2002)
| Test | Score |
|---|---|
| Overall | 5 /5 stars |
| Frontal offset | 13.15/16 |
| Side impact | 16/16 |
| Pole | 2/2 |
| Seat belt reminders | 2/3 |
| Whiplash protection | Not Assessed |
| Pedestrian protection | Poor |
| Electronic stability control | Optional |

ANCAP test results* Saab 9-3 Convertible (2003)
| Test | Score |
|---|---|
| Overall | 5 /5 stars |
| Frontal offset | 12.54/16 |
| Side impact | 16/16 |
| Pole | 2/2 |
| Seat belt reminders | 2/3 |
| Whiplash protection | Not Assessed |
| Pedestrian protection | Poor |
| Electronic stability control | Not Assessed |

=== Motorsports ===
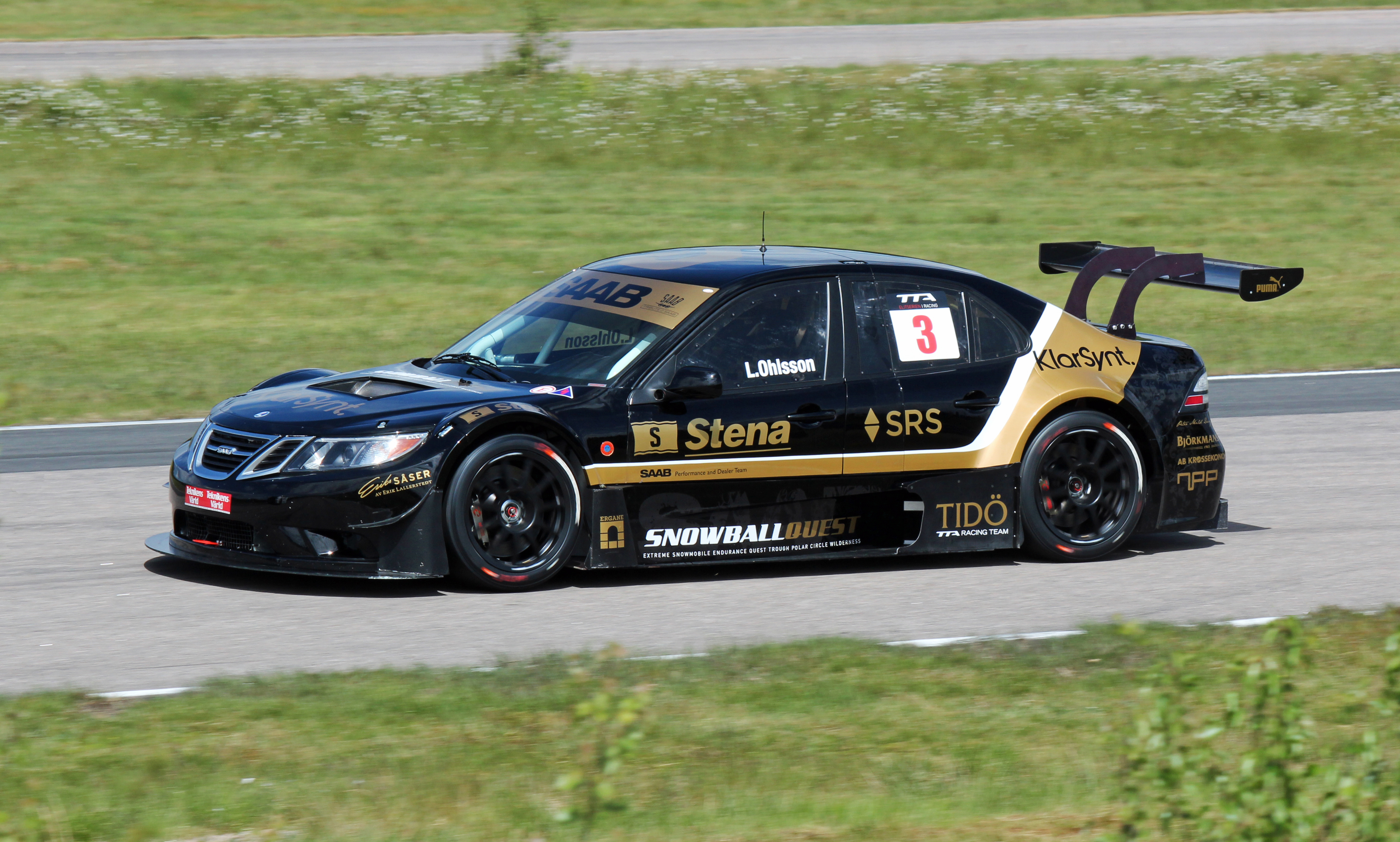
Saab 9-3 TTA

After the demise of the Saab Automobile and the 9-3 phasing out of the market, the heavily modified 9-3s complied to TTA – Racing Elite League regulations have been raced in 2012 TTA season and from 2013 to 2016 STCC season.

=== Second-generation 9-3 engines ===
Note: Diesel, biopower, and certain petrol engines were not available in North America. Starting from late 2004, diesel engines are Fiat-sourced common-rail units.

| Model | Years | Engine and type | | Displ. | Power | Torque | Turbocharger | Manufacturer measured acceleration (0–100 km/h), manual/automatic |
|---|---|---|---|---|---|---|---|---|
| 1.8i | 2004–2009 | I4 16V | Ecotec Z18XE | 1796 cc | 122 PS (90 kW; 120 hp) @ 5800 rpm | 167 N⋅m (123 lb⋅ft) @ 3800 rpm | None | 11,5 s |
| 1.8t | 2003–2006 | I4 16V | Ecotec B207E | 1998 cc | 150 PS (110 kW; 148 hp) @ 5500 rpm | 240 N⋅m (177 lbf⋅ft) @ 2000–3500 rpm | Garrett GT2052s; Low-pressure; 7.3 psi (0.50 bar) | 9,5 s / 10,7 s |
| 1.8t | 2007–2012 | I4 16V | Ecotec B207E | 1998 cc | 150 PS (110 kW; 148 hp) @ 5500 rpm | 240 N⋅m (177 lbf⋅ft) @ 2000–3500 rpm | MHI TD04-11TK; Low-pressure; 7.3 psi (0.50 bar) | 9,5 s / 10,7 s |
| 2.0t | 2003–2006 | I4 16V | Ecotec B207L | 1998 cc | 175 PS (129 kW; 173 hp) @ 5500 rpm | 265 N⋅m (195 lb⋅ft) @ 2500–4000 rpm | Garrett GT2052s; Mid-pressure; 8.7 psi (0.60 bar) | 8,5 s / 9,7 s |
| 2.0t | 2007–2012 | I4 16V | Ecotec B207L | 1998 cc | 175 PS (129 kW; 173 hp) @ 5500 rpm | 265 N⋅m (195 lb⋅ft) @ 2500–4000 rpm | MHI TD04-11TK; Mid-pressure; 8.7 psi (0.60 bar) | 8,5 s / 9,7 s |
| 2.0T | 2003–2012 | I4 16V | Ecotec B207R | 1998 cc | 210 PS (154 kW; 207 hp) @ 5300 rpm | 300 N⋅m (221 lbf⋅ft) @ 2500–4000 rpm | MHI TD04-14T; High-pressure; 12.3 psi (0.85 bar) | 7,9 s / 8,8 s |
| 1.8t BioPower | 2007–2012 | I4 16V | Ecotec B207E | 1998 cc | 150 PS (110 kW; 148 hp) @ 5500 rpm (Petrol); 172 PS (127 kW; 170 hp) @ 5500 rpm (E85) | 240 N⋅m (177 lbf⋅ft) @ 2000–3500 rpm (Petrol); 265 N⋅m (195 lb⋅ft) @ 2000–3500 rpm (E85) | MHI TD04-11TK; Low-pressure; 7.3 psi (0.50 bar) | |
| 2.0t BioPower | 2007–2012 | I4 16V | Ecotec B207L | 1998 cc | 175 PS (129 kW; 173 hp) @ 5500 rpm (Petrol); 200 PS (147 kW; 197 hp) @ 5500 rpm (E85) | 265 N⋅m (195 lb⋅ft) @ 2500–4000 rpm (Petrol); 300 N⋅m (221 lbf⋅ft) @ 2500–4000 rpm (E85) | MHI TD04-11TK; Mid-pressure; 8.7 psi (0.60 bar) | |
| 2.0t BioPower | 2012 | I4 16V | Ecotec A20NFT | 1998 cc | 163 PS (120 kW; 161 hp) @ 5300 rpm (E85) | 320 N⋅m (236 lb⋅ft) @ 2500 rpm | Borg Warner KKK K04 | |
| 2.0t BioPower | 2012 | I4 16V | Ecotec A20NFT | 1998 cc | 220 PS (162 kW; 217 hp) @ 5300 rpm (E85) | 350 N⋅m (258 lb⋅ft) @ 2500 rpm | Borg Warner KKK K04 | |
| 2.8T V6 | 2006 | V6 24V | LP9 | 2792 cc | 250 PS (184 kW; 247 hp) @ 5500 rpm | 350 N⋅m (258 lbf⋅ft) @ 1800–4500 rpm | MHI TD04-15T; Mid-pressure; 8.7 psi (0.60 bar) | |
| 2.8T V6 | 2007–2008 (FWD) | V6 24V | LP9 | 2792 cc | 255 PS (188 kW; 252 hp) @ 5500 rpm | 355 N⋅m (262 lb⋅ft) @ 1800–4500 rpm | MHI TD04-15T; Mid-pressure; 8.7 psi (0.60 bar) | |
| 2.8T V6 | 2008–2010 (XWD) | V6 24V | LP9 | 2792 cc | 280 PS (206 kW; 276 hp) @ 5500 rpm | 400 N⋅m (295 lbf⋅ft) @ 2150 rpm | MHI TD04-15T; High-pressure; 12.3 psi (0.85 bar) | |
| 1.9 TiD | 2005–2010 | I4 8V | Z19DT | 1910 cc | 120 PS (88 kW; 118 hp) @ 4000 rpm | 280 N⋅m (207 lbf⋅ft) @ 2000–2750 rpm | High-pressure | |
| 1.9 TiD | 2005–2010 | I4 16V | Z19DTH | 1910 cc | 150 PS (110 kW; 148 hp) @ 4000 rpm | 320 N⋅m (236 lbf⋅ft) @ 2000–2750 rpm | High-pressure | |
| 1.9 TTiD | 2011–2012 | I4 16V | A19DTR | 1910 cc | 130 PS (96 kW; 128 hp) @ 4000 rpm | 320 N⋅m (236 lbf⋅ft) @ 1500-2750 rpm | High-pressure twin turbo | |
| 1.9 TTiD | 2011–2012 | I4 16V | A19DTR | 1910 cc | 160 PS (118 kW; 158 hp) @ 4000 rpm | 360 N⋅m (266 lbf⋅ft) @ 2000–2500 rpm | High-pressure twin turbo | |
| 1.9 TTiD | 2008–2012 | I4 16V | Z19DTR | 1910 cc | 180 PS (132 kW; 178 hp) @ 4000 rpm | 370 N⋅m (273 lbf⋅ft) @ 1500-2750 rpm (AT); 400 N⋅m (295 lbf⋅ft) @ 2000–2500 rpm (MT) | High-pressure twin turbo | |
| 2.2 TiD | 2003–2004 | I4 16V | D223L | 2171 cc | 125 PS (92 kW; 123 hp) @ 4000 rpm | 280 N⋅m (207 lbf⋅ft) @ 1500 rpm | High-pressure; 13.1 psi (0.90 bar) | 11,0 s / 11,0 s |

== Third generation ==
Work on a third-generation Saab 9-3 started in 2007, when designers in General Motors facilities in Rüsselsheim and Detroit began work on a design study. The design language was supervised by Simon Padian, and the design team managed to produce a clay model and several computer models before General Motors announced it had put the Saab brand "under review" in December 2008.

After an intended sale of Saab to Swedish sports car manufacturer Koenigsegg ultimately failed in 2009, General Motors reached an agreement with Dutch manufacturer Spyker N.V. in January 2010. The sale of Saab to Spyker was completed in late February 2010 and work on a replacement for the 9-3 was restarted virtually immediately. The new management of Saab, headed by CEO Victor Muller, felt, however, that a new design language was needed to distance a newly independent Saab from General Motors.

Muller hired Jason Castriota in June 2010 to work on a scalable car platform that would serve as the basis for future Saabs, beginning with the replacement for the 9-3. In October 2010 a number of prototypes were produced and evaluated against the prototypes made in 2007. Eventually, Castriota's prototype was chosen and the design team was instructed to develop a five-door combi coupé, a convertible, and a crossover on the new platform.

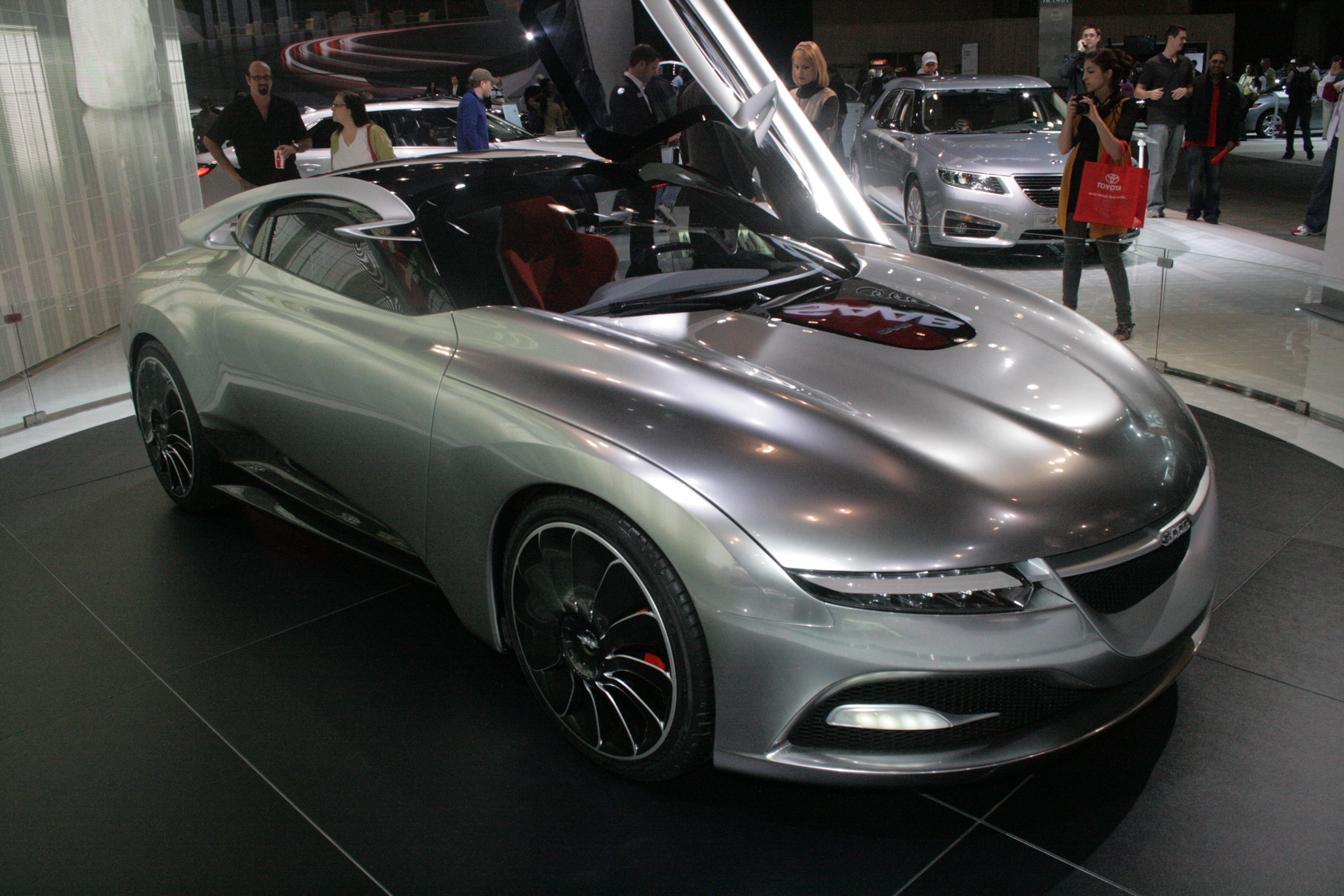
Saab PhoeniX

The work on the new platform culminated in the unveiling of the Saab PhoeniX concept car at the Geneva Motor Show in March 2011. By that time, Saab had run into serious cash flow problems, but work on the PhoeniX platform and the 9-3 replacement continued to the point that bankruptcy papers were filed in late 2011.

The replacement of the 9-3, which had been renamed 900 by that time, was to have a 1.6 liter turbo engine supplied by BMW, who would have also supplied the cars' start-stop system. The car was to have a hybrid drivetrain and was to be released in both a premium Aero and an economy Vector variant.

When Saab finally filed for bankruptcy in December 2011, Castriota and his team had already finished most of the work on the car's body and its engineering, with the interior being the only part yet to be developed. The car was set to be completed by fall of 2012. The main assets of the bankrupt company were acquired by National Electric Vehicle Sweden (NEVS), which may revisit the PhoeniX platform. NEVS was focusing its efforts on producing an electric variant of the second generation 9-3.

== 2014 (NEVS) ==
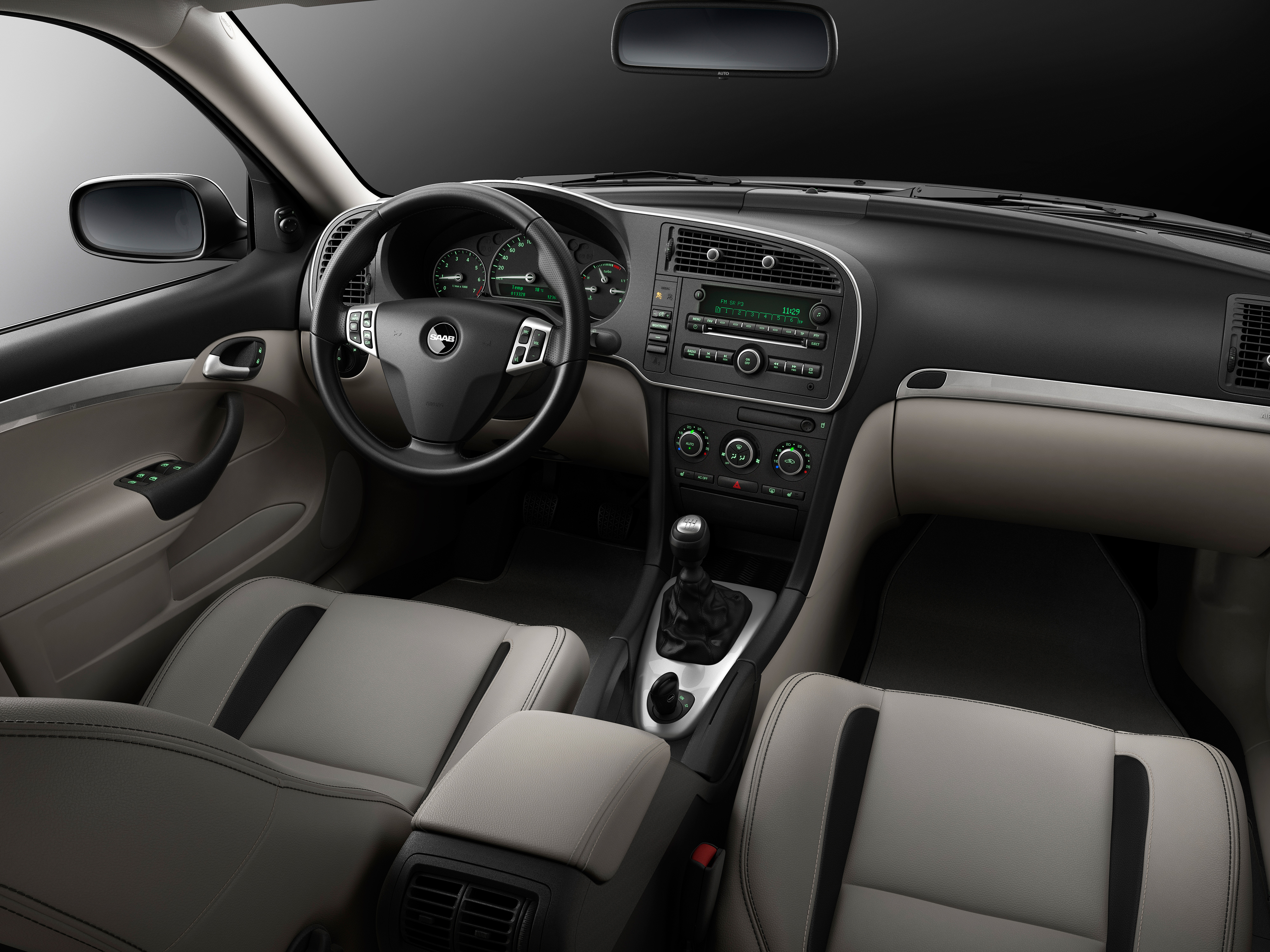
MY14 Saab 9-3 Interior

Saab 9-3 Aero MY14
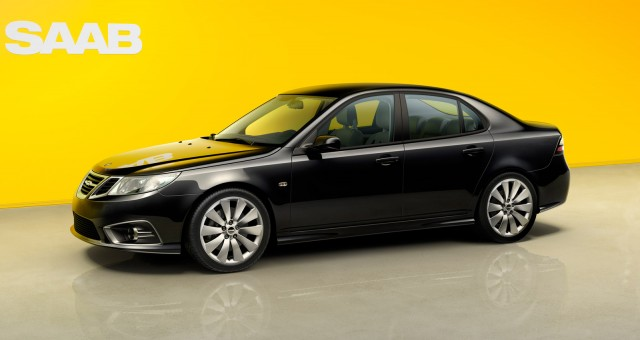

Overview
- Production: December 2013 – May 2014
- Assembly: Sweden: Trollhättan (NEVS)
- Designer: Michael Mauer, Einar Hareide, Anders Gustafsson

Body and chassis
- Body style: 4-door sedan
- Layout: Transverse front-engine, front-wheel drive
- Platform: GM Epsilon platform
- Related: Fiat Croma; Cadillac BLS; Opel Signum; Opel Vectra; NEVS 9-3 EV

Powertrain
- Engine: 2.0 L A20NHT turbo I4
- Transmission: 6-speed F40 manual 6-speed Aisin AF40-6 automatic

Dimensions
- Wheelbase: 2,675 mm (105.3 in)
- Length: Sedan: 4,668 mm (183.8 in)
- Width: Sedan: 2,038 mm (80.25 in)
- Height: Sedan: 1,450 mm (57.1 in)
- Curb weight: 1,410 to 1,690 kg (3,109 to 3,726 lb)

National Electric Vehicle Sweden (NEVS) restarted production of the model year 2014 Saab 9-3 Aero Sedan on 2 December 2013, in Saab's former Trollhättan assembly plant. The only exterior difference on the MY14 model is the lack of the Griffin badge, to which NEVS does not own the rights. The Griffin is replaced with a badge displaying the Saab logotype, as well as new seats. The 9-3 Aero features a 220 PS (162 kW) 2.0-liter direct-injected twin-scroll turbocharged Ecotec engine and the car went on sale in Sweden on 10 December. The first cars were to deliver in Spring 2014 as a "Limited Edition" model. Only two colors were available, black and Silver.

The 9-3 no longer meets the latest Euro NCAP tests regarding pedestrian safety; therefore, only 1,000 cars of each body model could be sold in Europe, as a low-volume manufacturer. The only other market was China. An electric version was to be launched in spring 2014 in the Chinese market. The updated 9-3 have been tested favourably by motoring magazines. Vi Bilägare wrote that it feels modern and feels sporty yet comfortable.

Saab automobile production ended as of May 2014 because Qingbo Investment, one of NEVS shareholders, was not able to reach a financing agreement. By the end of 2014, India's Mahindra & Mahindra agreed to buy a majority stake in NEVS. In February 2015, it was announced that the remaining 100 cars that were stuck on the halted production line since May 2014 would be completed.

Production of the electric 9-3 in China was started in 2017.

== Awards and recognition ==
2010

- Saab 9-3 received an award as the most reliable vehicle in the middle class. With 50,000 km, 93.1% of Saabs showed no defect requiring the service and for the 100,000 km, this percentage is still respectable and is 84.2%.

2009

- US Insurance Institute for Highway Safety (IIHS) 'Top Safety Pick Award' in the midsize luxury category.

2008

- US Insurance Institute for Highway Safety (IIHS) 'Top Safety Pick Award' in the midsize luxury category.

2007

- US Insurance Institute for Highway Safety (IIHS) 'Top Safety Pick Award' in the midsize luxury category.

2006

- US Insurance Institute for Highway Safety (IIHS) 'Top Safety Pick Gold Award' in the midsize luxury category.
- Wards Automotive list the 2.8 L V6 in the 9-3 among their 10 Best Engines of 2006.

== See also ==
- Saab 9-5
