= Einar Hareide =

Einar Hareide may refer to:

- Einar Hareide (politician)
- Einar Hareide (designer)
