= Saab Active Head Restraints =

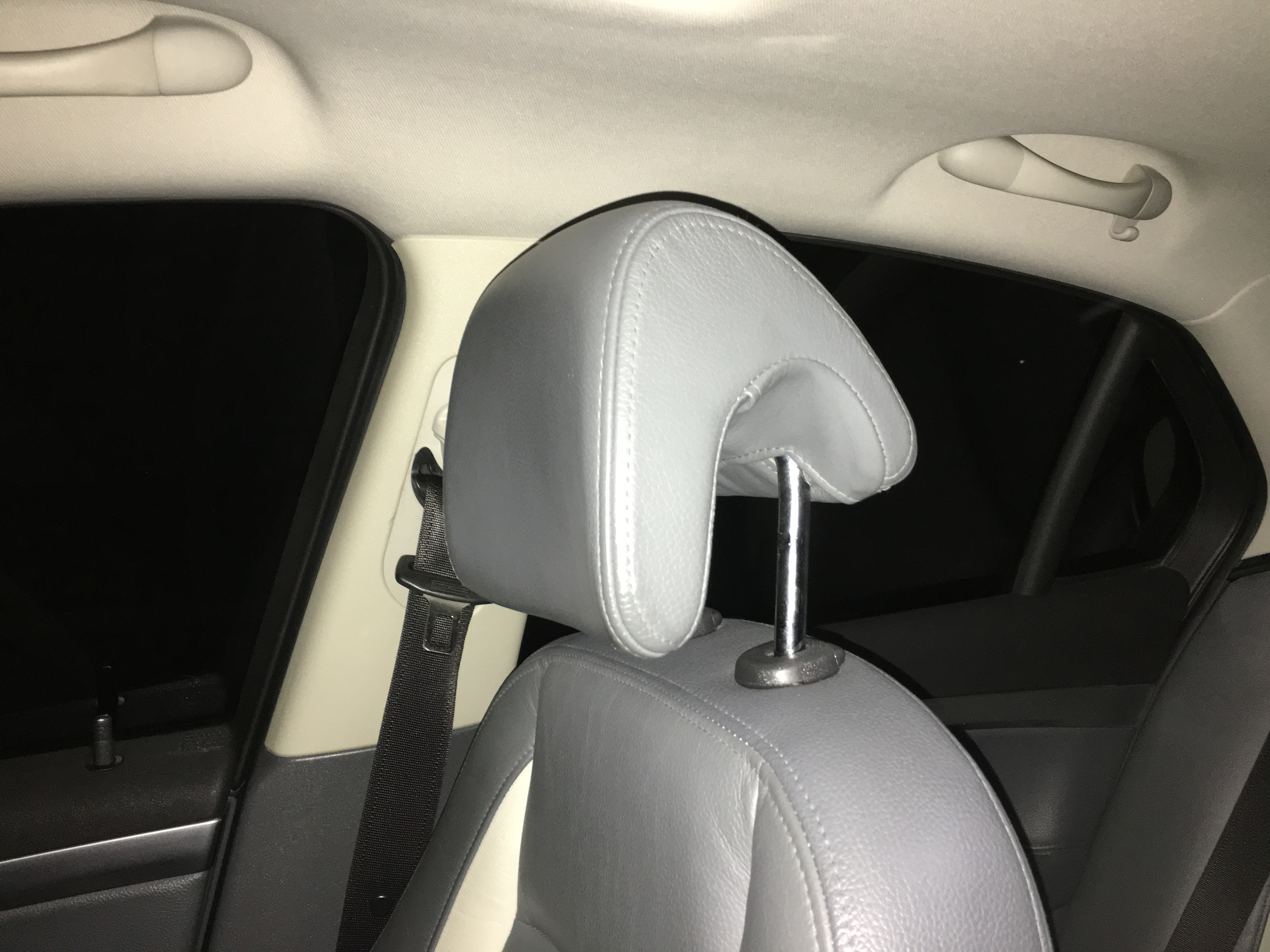
SAHR II in Saab 9-3

Saab Active Head Restraints or SAHR is a system to protect against automotive whiplash injuries introduced by Saab in 1997. It was launched when the Saab 9-5 was released for the 1998 model year and had been part of the standard equipment on the Saab 9-3 and 9-5 since.

== Details ==
SAHR is mounted at the top of a frame, inside the seat-back, which is designed to pivot at its mid point. In a rear-end impact, the occupant’s lower back is forced rearwards by inertia against the bottom portion of the seat-back. A mechanical linkage in the frame then forces the upper half, carrying the head restraint, upwards and forwards to catch the occupant’s head and help minimise the amount of whiplash movement. The Benefit of the SAHR's system is that the headrest doesn't require replacement once used, unlike BMW and Volvo's WHIPS systems.

SAHR 2 was introduced for the 2003 model year standard on the Saab 9-3. SAHR 2 was designed for even faster activation in rear impacts at lower speeds. The head restraint is activated as soon as the lower back is pressed into the setback by the occupant’s inertia during a rear impact.

== Statistics ==
In 2002 a study conducted by the Insurance Institute for Highway Safety that investigated property damage insurance claims found that Saab's active head restraint design produced a 55 percent reduction in claim rates for women and a 31 percent reduction for men. This is when compared to traditional head restraints.

== Awards ==
- Technology Award for the Saab Active Head Restraint - Prince Michael Road Safety Awards, Great Britain - 1997
- Industry Award For the Saab Active Head Restraint - The Windscreens O'Brian Safety Award, Australia - 1997
- Special Prize for the Saab Active Head Restraint - The Danish Association of Polio, Traffic and Accident Victims (PTU), Denmark - 1996

== See also ==
- Saab 9-3
- Saab 9-5
- Head restraint
