= NEVS 9-3 EV =

NEVS 9-3EV

Overview
- Manufacturer: NEVS
- Also called: Saab 9-3 (combustion-engined; 2013–2014)
- Production: 2017–2022
- Assembly: China: Tianjin (NEVS' Tianjin plant)
- Designer: Michael Mauer, Einar Hareide, Anders Gustafsson

Body and chassis
- Body style: 4-door sedan
- Platform: GM Epsilon platform
- Related: Saab 9-3

Powertrain
- Electric motor: 130 kW (176.8 PS; 174.3 hp) Permanent Magnet Synchronous Reluctance Motor
- Battery: CATL Li-ion

Dimensions
- Wheelbase: 2,675 mm (105.3 in)
- Length: 4,646 mm (182.9 in)
- Width: 1,762 mm (69.4 in)
- Height: 1,450 mm (57.1 in)

Chronology
- Predecessor: Saab 9-3

The NEVS 9-3EV is an electric compact executive car produced by NEVS from December 2017 to 2022.

== History ==
The 9-3EV is a slightly modernized Saab 9-3 of the second generation after a design facelift. It was built on the same platform - GM Epsilon I platform, which was used to build, among others the Chevrolet Malibu and the Opel Vectra.

Compared to the Saab 9-3 model produced in 2013 by NEVS, the car is distinguished by a slightly higher bonnet to comply with current pedestrian safety regulations, a slightly remodeled radiator grille, as well as fog lights and additional direction indicators located in the exterior mirrors.

The electric motor is responsible for the drive of the vehicle. Its range is on average 300 km (190 mi) on a single charge.

NEVS presented the 9-3 sedan and the 9-3X station wagon at CES Asia held in June 2017 in Shanghai. Pre-series production started after a launching ceremony was held on 5 December 2017 in Tianjin. The first delivery to a customer took place on 29 December 2018. Series production started on 29 June 2019 in Tianjin.

Production of the 9-3EV came to an end in 2022 just before NEVS reduced its workforce to a minimum in March 2023 and froze operations.

=== 9-3 EVs in Sweden ===
Even though the 9-3 EV was launched exclusively for the Chinese market, the prototypes of the 9-3 EV, as well as some pre-series production cars, were developed in the Frickeboa pre-production shop Trollhättan in Sweden. As of March 2022, the factory in Trollhättan owns the following 9-3 EVs:

- 8 prototypes with a 150 kW engine developed between November 2013 and February 2014;
- 5 prototypes with a 100 kW engine developed between June 2014 and February 2016;
- 13 pre-series production cars with a 130 kW engine built in the Frickeboa between January and March 2018;
- 9 production cars with a 130 kW engine built in 2019 in Tianjin, China, and imported to Sweden.

The latter 9 production cars were part of a shipment of 10 cars imported to Sweden in May 2020.
