= Einar Hareide (designer) =

Norwegian industrial designer

Einar Hareide (born 27 March 1959 in Hareid Municipality) is a Norwegian industrial designer.

Starting in 1985, Einar Hareide started for the automobile manufacturer Saab to work on the exterior of the new Saab 900. In 1989, he was hired by Mercedes-Benz where he themed the 1994 Mercedes-Benz E-Class (W210), but returned to Saab in 1991 to developed the exterior design of the Saab 9-5. He became design director in 1994. In 1999, he co-founded Hareide Design in Moss, Norway.

His design company Hareide Designmill launched the battery jumper Startloop in 2002, which became part of the MoMa's permanent collection in 2003. In 2016, his firm dove into superyacht concept design.

== See also ==
- Saab 9-5
