= DMAX V6 engine =

Overview
- Manufacturer: Isuzu

Layout
- Configuration: V6
- Displacement: 2,958 cc (3.0 L; 180.5 cu in)
- Valvetrain: 4 valves x cyl.

Combustion
- Turbocharger: Garrett Motion (Y30DT/P9X 701); Borg Warner (Z30DT/P9X 715); Variable-geometry with intercooler
- Fuel system: Denso Common rail direct injection
- Fuel type: Diesel
- Cooling system: Water-cooled

Output
- Power output: 170–184 PS (125–135 kW; 168–181 hp)
- Torque output: 350–400 N⋅m (258–295 lb⋅ft)

The DMAX V6 engine is a 2,958 cc (3.0 L; 180.5 cu in) diesel engine.

It was designed, and is produced by Isuzu in Fujisawa, Kanagawa, Japan, but the design rights to the engine are now owned by General Motors. It uses high-pressure common rail direct injection with four valve per cylinder, cylinder heads. A variable-geometry turbocharger and intercooler are also used. The engine was used in Europe by GM's Opel and Saab subsidiaries and by Renault.

Output is nominally 125 kW (170 PS; 168 hp) at 4000 rpm and 350 N⋅m (258 lb⋅ft) at 1800 rpm. The engine's internal name is 6DE1.

Applications:

- Saab 9-5
  - 2001-2005: D308L, 177 PS (175 hp; 130 kW).
- Opel/Vauxhall Vectra and Signum
  - 2003-2005: Y30DT, 177 PS (175 hp; 130 kW).
  - 2005-2008: Z30DT, 184 PS (181 hp; 135 kW).

== Renault ==
- Renault Vel Satis
  - 2000-2010: P9X 701, 177 hp (132 kW; 179 PS).
  - 2005-2010: P9X 715, 181 hp (135 kW; 184 PS).
- Renault Espace
  - 2002-2006: P9X 701, 177 hp (132 kW; 179 PS).
  - 2006-2010: P9X 715, 181 hp (135 kW; 184 PS).

== See also ==
- List of GM engines
