= Opel Signum =

German car model

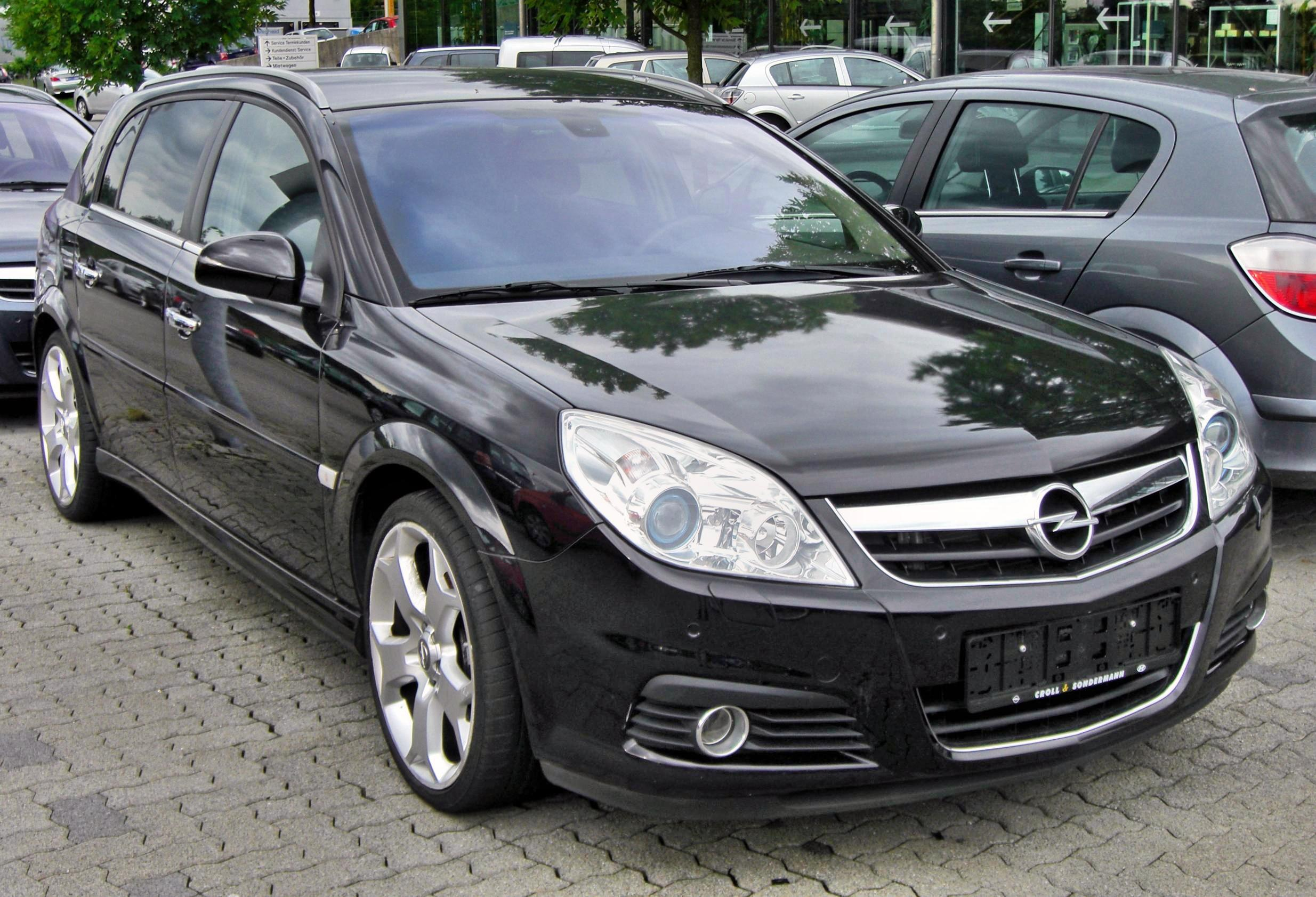

Overview
- Manufacturer: Opel (General Motors)
- Also called: Vauxhall Signum
- Production: 2003–2008
- Assembly: Germany: Rüsselsheim

Body and chassis
- Class: Mid-size car (D)
- Body style: 5-door hatchback
- Layout: Front-engine, front-wheel-drive
- Platform: Epsilon platform
- Related: Fiat Croma; Chevrolet Malibu; Opel Vectra; Saturn Aura; Saab 9-3

Dimensions
- Wheelbase: 2,830 mm (111.4 in)
- Length: 4,636 mm (182.5 in)
- Width: 1,798 mm (70.8 in)
- Height: 1,466 mm (57.7 in)
- Curb weight: 1,490–1,715 kg (3,285–3,781 lb)

Chronology
- Predecessor: Opel Omega
- Successor: Opel Insignia Sports Tourer

The Opel Signum is a large front-engine, front-wheel drive, five-passenger, mid-size executive hatchback manufactured and marketed by the German car manufacturer Opel from 2003 to 2008, exclusively over a single generation, derived from the Opel Vectra. Marketed almost exclusively in Europe, a rebadged Signum was marketed in the United Kingdom as the Vauxhall Signum. The Signum used the long wheelbase version of the GM Epsilon platform also used by the Opel Vectra Caravan.

As a very large hatchback with a nearly vertical tailgate, its dimensions placed it between traditional large family cars and executive cars. In most markets, it was also priced accordingly (more expensive than the Opel Vectra, but less than e.g. Audi A6). The Opel Signum, like the Renault Vel Satis, was intended to capture a new market segment.

General Motors, Opel's then parent, executed a similar concept in North America of a large hatchback with the related 2004 Chevrolet Malibu Maxx, also derived from the Epsilon platform.

After March 2008, RHD production ended, and both the Opel Signum and the Opel Vectra were replaced with the new Opel Insignia in October of the same year. From the end of 2005, Pierluigi Collina starred in adverts across Europe for the Signum, as well as the Vectra.

Production of the Signum and Vectra C ended in July 2008 for Mainland Europe.

== 2001 Signum2 Concept ==
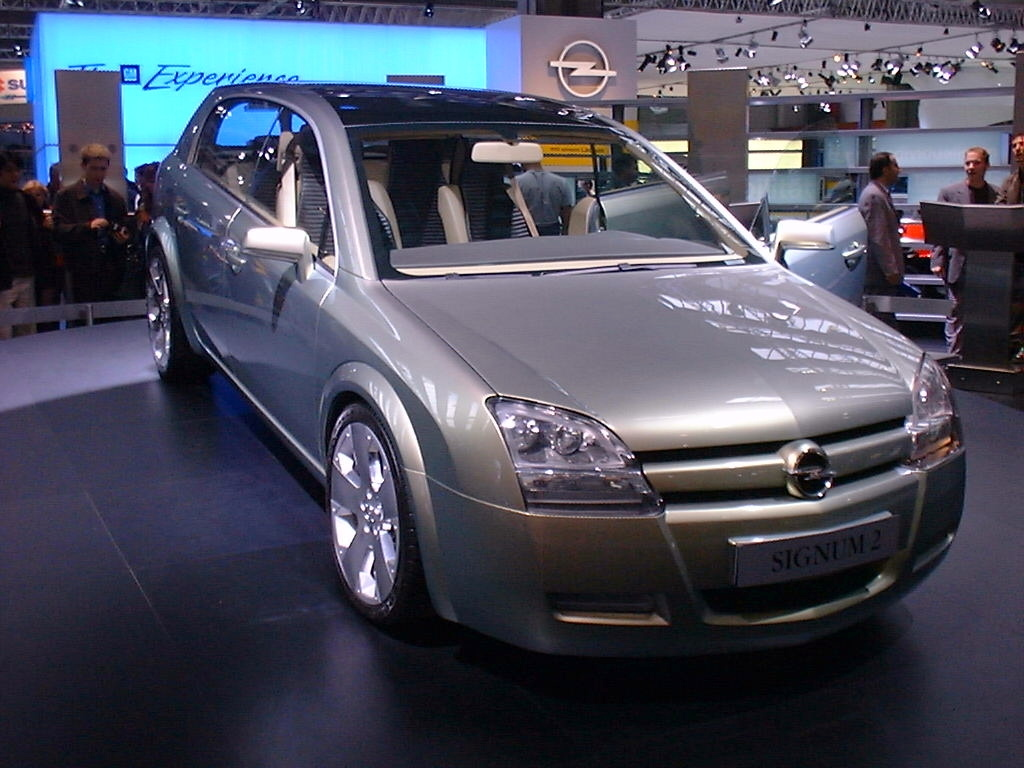
Opel Signum2 Concept

The Opel Signum2 Concept was a luxury hatchback presented by Opel at the 2001 Frankfurt Motor Show in Germany, and the 2001 Bologna Motor Show in Italy. Design elements from the car were later used in the production Signum, which went into production in February 2003. In November 2000, sketches of the Signum2 were present.

The Signum name was also used on a concept car presented at the 1997 Geneva Motor Show in Switzerland. In August 2001, the name of the car was announced.

The first official pictures of the production Signum were released in August 2002.

== Differences compared to Vectra ==
The Signum platform is that of the Vectra Estate, meaning that the wheelbase is longer than the hatchback/saloon of the Vectra by 13 cm (5.1 in). This provides for very ample rear legroom. Instead of a traditional three passenger bench seat, the Signum has two separate seats in the rear, offering a range of adjustment capabilities including sliding back and forth (just like the front seats) and reclining backrests.

There is also a very narrow central section, which includes a folding armrest and can also serve as a third seat (the Signum is fitted with three rear headrests and safety belts). The seats can also be folded down individually to increase the cargo space, a system that Opel calls Flexspace.

The Signum shares many body panels (including the complete front part of the body) and interior elements (in particular the complete dashboard and front seats) with the Vectra, but the tailgate and rear fender design is unique to the Signum. The Signum was facelifted along with the Vectra lineup in September 2005, getting a new front fascia design and slight changes elsewhere.

All Signums were made alongside Vectras in Opel's Rüsselsheim plant in Germany.

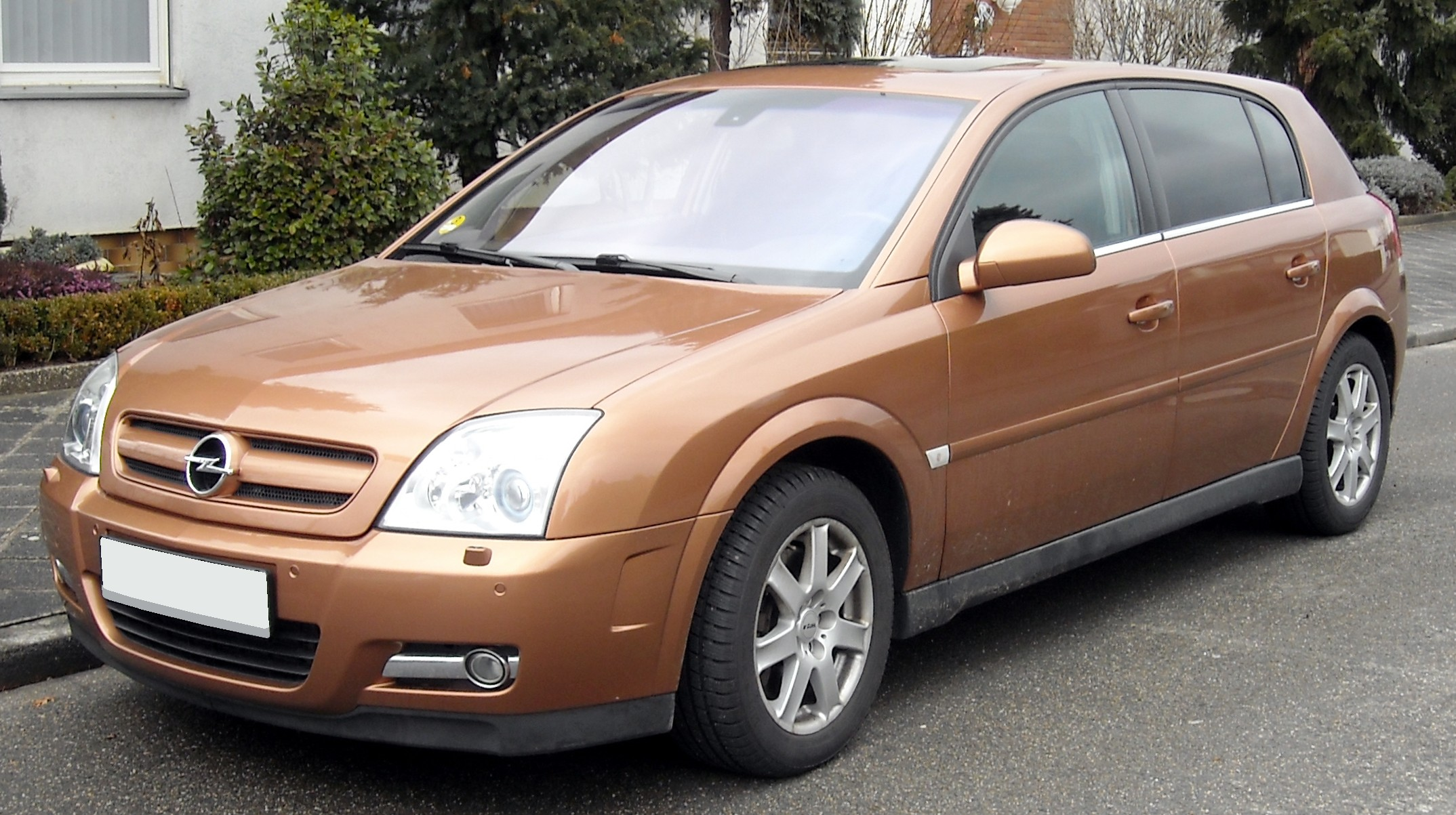
Front view (pre-facelift)

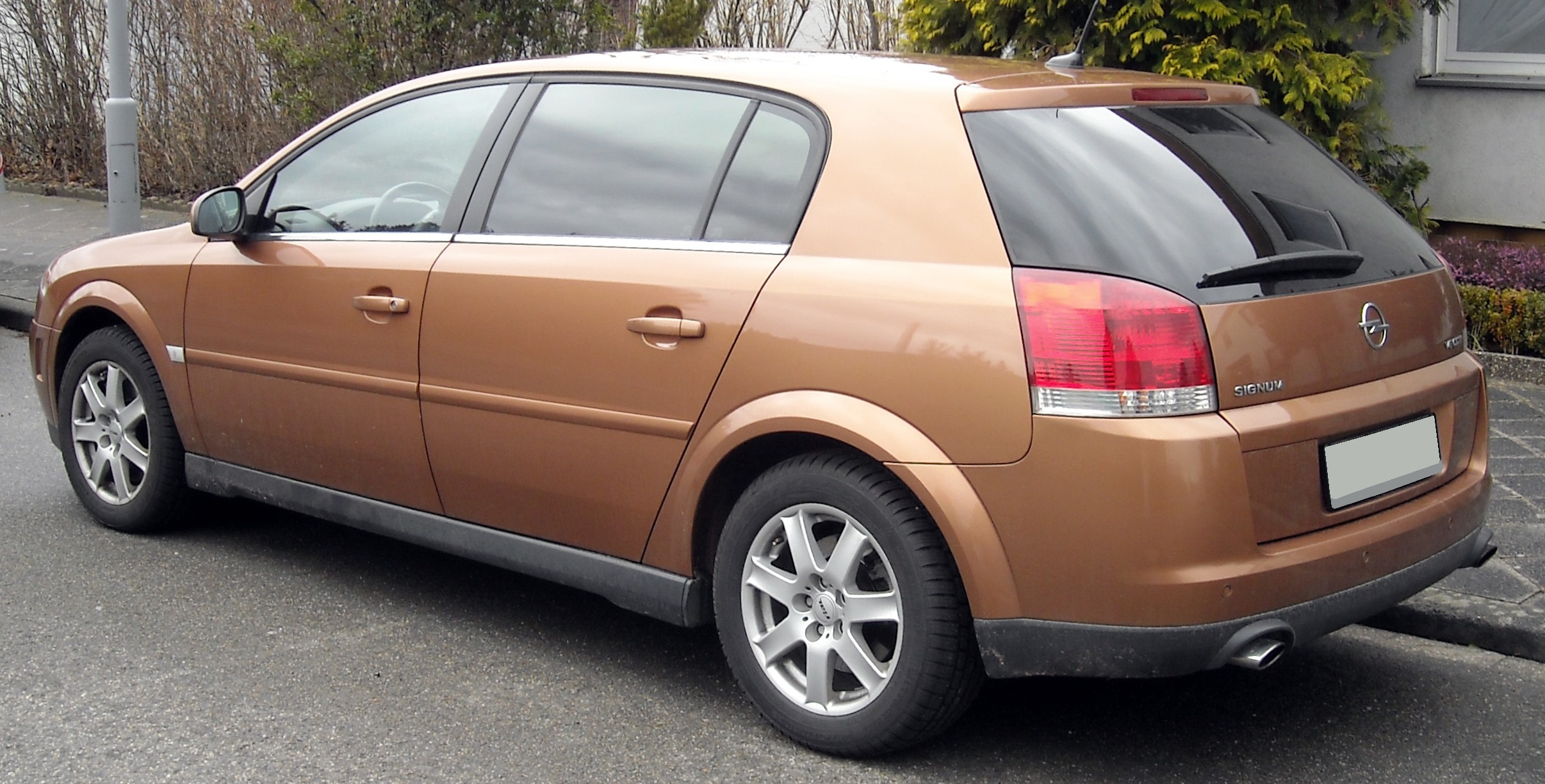
Rear view (pre-facelift)

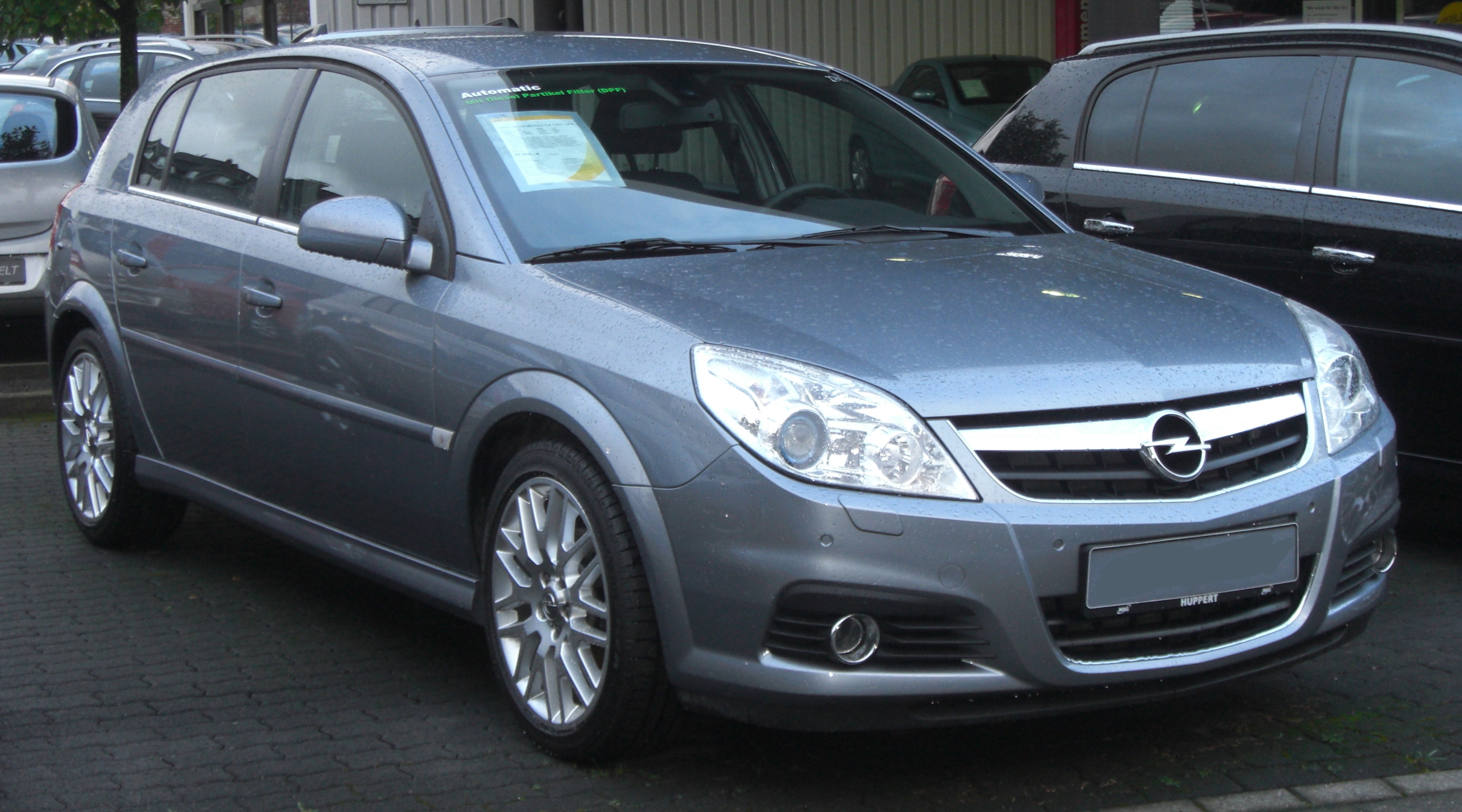
Front view (facelift)

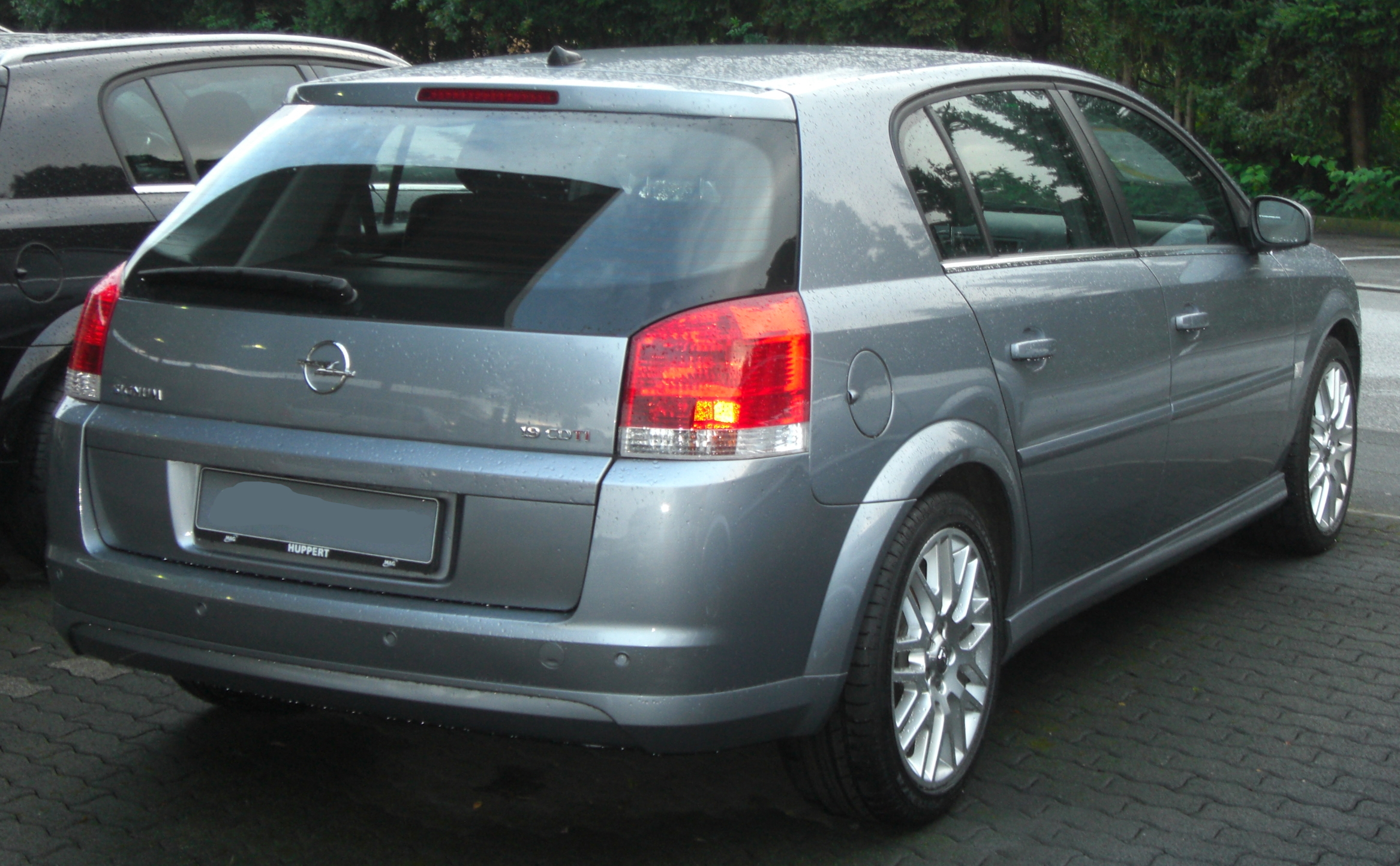
Rear view (facelift)

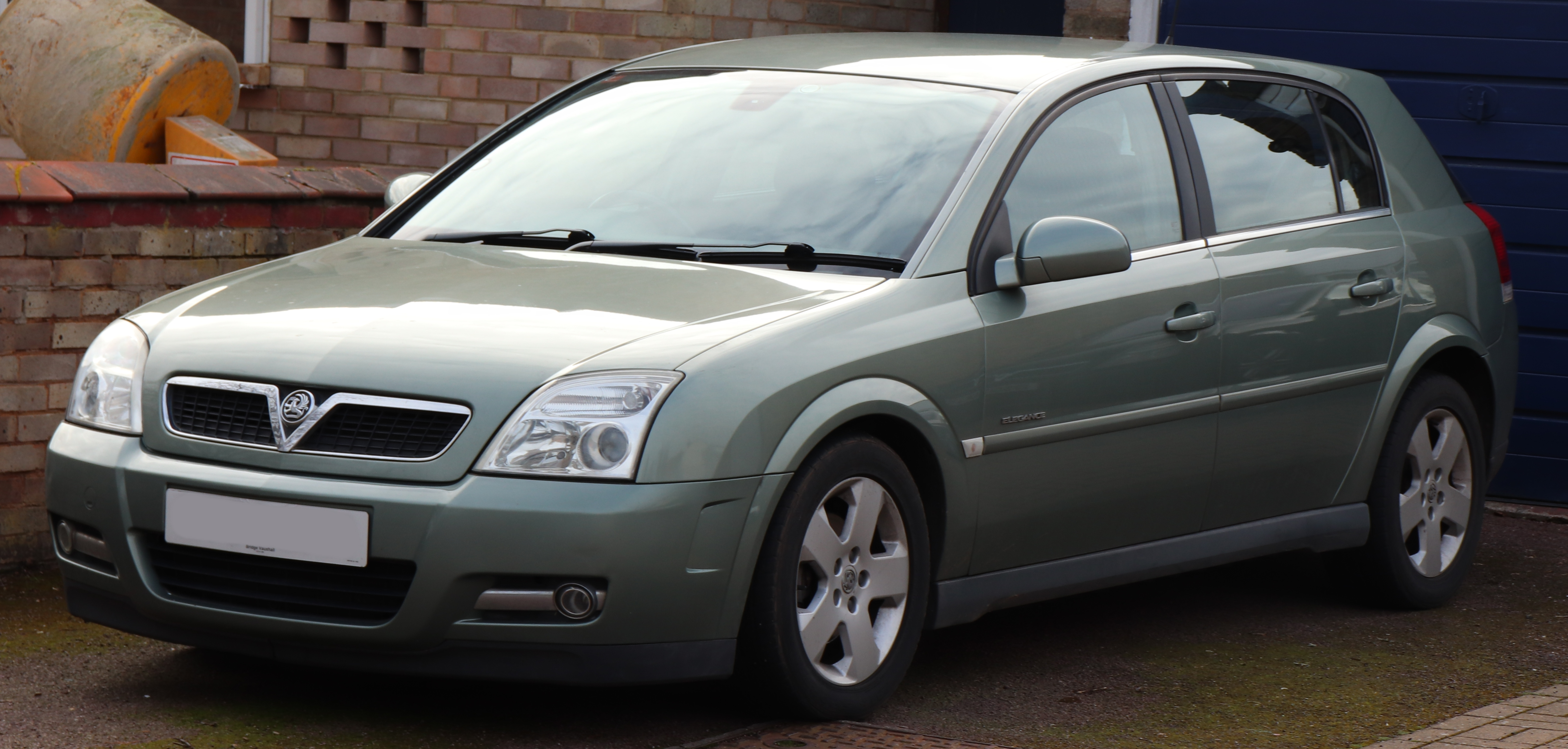
Vauxhall Signum (Pre-facelift)

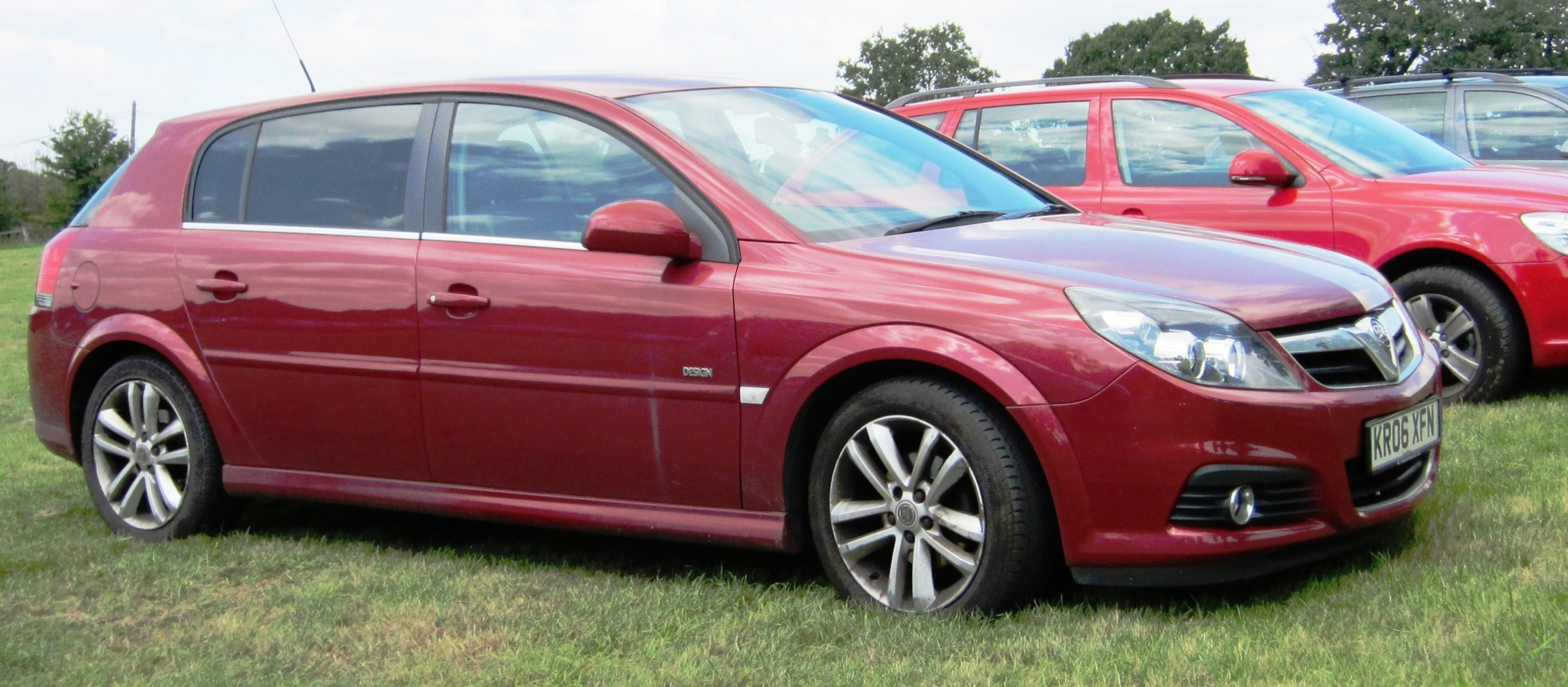
Facelift

== Engines ==
The Signum was offered with a wide range engines it shared with the Vectra. These include:

	Petrol engine					
Model	Engine code	Engine type	Displacement	Power	Torque	Years
1.8	Z18XE	I4 16V	1,796 cc (1.8 L)	122 PS (90 kW; 120 hp) at 6000 rpm	167 N⋅m (123 lb⋅ft) at 3800 rpm	2003–'05
1.8	Z18XER	I4 16V	1,796 cc (1.8 L)	140 PS (103 kW; 138 hp) at 6300 rpm	175 N⋅m (129 lb⋅ft) at 3800 rpm	2006–'08
2.0 Turbo	Z20NET	Turbo I4 16V	1,998 cc (2.0 L)	175 PS (129 kW; 173 hp) at 5500 rpm	265 N⋅m (195 lb⋅ft) at 2500–3800 rpm	2003–'08
2.2 Direct	Z22YH	I4 16V	2,198 cc (2.2 L)	155 PS (114 kW; 153 hp) at 5600 rpm	220 N⋅m (162 lb⋅ft) at 3800 rpm	2003–'08
2.8 V6 Turbo	Z28NEL	Turbo V6	2,792 cc (2.8 L)	230 PS (169 kW; 227 hp) at 5500 rpm	330 N⋅m (243 lb⋅ft) at 1800–4500 rpm	2005–'06
2.8 V6 Turbo	Z28NET	Turbo V6	2,792 cc (2.8 L)	250 PS (184 kW; 247 hp) at 5500 rpm	350 N⋅m (258 lb⋅ft) at 1800–4500 rpm	2006–'08
3.2 V6	Z32SE	V6	3,175 cc (3.2 L)	211 PS (155 kW; 208 hp) at 6200 rpm	300 N⋅m (221 lb⋅ft) at 4000 rpm	2003–'05
	Diesel engine					
	Model	Engine	Displacement	Power	Torque	Years
1.9 CDTI	Z19DTL	I4 8V	1,910 cc (1.9 L)	100 PS (74 kW; 99 hp) at 3500 rpm	260 N⋅m (192 lb⋅ft) at 1700–2500 rpm	2005–'08
1.9 CDTI	Z19DT	I4 8V	1,910 cc (1.9 L)	120 PS (88 kW; 118 hp) at 4000 rpm	280 N⋅m (207 lb⋅ft) at 2000–2750 rpm	2004–'08
1.9 CDTI	Z19DTH	I4 16V	1,910 cc (1.9 L)	150 PS (110 kW; 148 hp) at 4000 rpm	320 N⋅m (236 lb⋅ft) at 2000–2750 rpm	2004–'08
2.0 DTI	Y20DTH	I4 16V	1,995 cc (2.0 L)	100 PS (74 kW; 99 hp) at 4000 rpm	230 N⋅m (170 lb⋅ft) at 1500–2500 rpm	2003–'04
2.2 DTI	Y22DTR	I4 16V	2,172 cc (2.2 L)	125 PS (92 kW; 123 hp) at 4000 rpm	280 N⋅m (207 lb⋅ft) at 1500–2750 rpm	2003–'04
3.0 V6 CDTI	Y30DT	V6	2,958 cc (3.0 L)	177 PS (130 kW; 175 hp) at 4000 rpm	370 N⋅m (273 lb⋅ft) at 1900–2800 rpm	2003–'05
3.0 V6 CDTI	Z30DT	V6	2,958 cc (3.0 L)	184 PS (135 kW; 181 hp) at 4000 rpm	400 N⋅m (295 lb⋅ft) at 1900–2700 rpm	2005–'08

== Replacement ==
In July 2008, both the Signum and Vectra C were discontinued. Although no direct replacement was announced, much of the market territory it once occupied was filled by the Insignia (2008).

== See also ==
- List of Opel vehicles
- List of Vauxhall vehicles
- Renault Vel Satis
- Vauxhall Vectra
- Vauxhall Insignia
