= GM Ecotec Diesel (1997) =

Diesel engines

GM Ecotec 2.0DTI/2.2DTI

Overview
- Manufacturer: General Motors
- Production: 1997-2005

Layout
- Configuration: Inline-4
- Displacement: 2.0–2.2 L (1,995–2,172 cc)
- Cylinder head material: Aluminium
- Valvetrain: SOHC 4 valves x cyl.

Combustion
- Operating principle: Diesel
- Turbocharger: Garrett, Variable Geometry for 2.2 from 2001, intercooler
- Fuel system: Direct injection
- Fuel type: Diesel
- Oil system: Wet sump
- Cooling system: Water-cooled

Output
- Power output: 61–92 kW (83–125 PS; 82–123 hp)

Emissions
- Emissions target standard: Euro 3

Chronology
- Successor: Fiat JTD engine (CDTI)

GM referred to many of its diesel engines as Ecotec including the GM Medium Diesel engine (2013 onwards) and the Isuzu-derived Circle L engine. This page describes the SOHC 16 valve turbocharged engines which GM introduced in 1997. and which were used extensively in its European models.

The engines used a single chain-driven camshaft and an aluminium cylinder head with a Bosch rotary high pressure injection pump.

== Variants ==
The 2.0 engine was available in two different power outputs, badged by Vauxhall Di and DTi, the lower powered version retaining 16 valves and a turbocharger, but lacking the intercooler. The lower powered 82 hp (61 kW) version was soon replaced by the smaller and unrelated 1.7 litre Circle L engine. The higher powered version produced 100 hp (75 kW) and 230 N⋅m (170 lb⋅ft) of torque.

The 2.2 engine was introduced as a 115 hp (86 kW) unit, but in late 2000 was updated to 125 hp (93 kW) with 280 N⋅m (207 lb⋅ft) of torque from just 1,500 rpm, rather than the previous 260 N⋅m (192 lb⋅ft) from 1,900 rpm. The update also included changes to the camshaft and pistons, and the newer unit was smoother. This update also introduced pilot injection and a variable geometry turbocharger.

These engines were replaced by the 1.9 litre GM/Fiat JTD.

== Engine Codes ==
GM referred to these engines using a six-character code, such as Y20DTH. The first letter is X for Euro 2 engines, and Y for those meeting the Euro 3 emissions standard. The two digits are 20 for 2 litres (actually 1,995 cc), and 22 for 2.2 litres (actually 2,171 cc). The next two letters are always DT. The final letter is L if it lacks an intercooler, H if it has an intercooler, and R if it has both an intercooler and a variable geometry turbocharger.

Saab referred to the engine as a D223L, regardless of whether it was a Y22DTH or a Y22DTR.

== Applications ==
- Vauxhall/Opel Astra, fourth generation (2.0 only)
- Vauxhall/Opel Frontera, second generation (2.2 only)
- Vauxhall/Opel Omega B2
- Vauxhall/Opel Signum (until 2004)
- Vauxhall/Opel Sintra (2.2 only, 1999 only)
- Vauxhall/Opel Vectra, series B, and series C until 2004
- Vauxhall/Opel Zafira, series A (2.0 in UK, 2.2 also offered in some markets)
- Saab 9-3, first generation (2.2 only)
- Saab 9-3, second generation (2.2 only, until end 2004)
- Saab 9-5, first generation (2.2 only, 2002 to 2005)

== See also ==
- Motore Opel Ecotec Serie 20DT (Italian Wikipedia)
- Motore Opel Ecotec Serie 22DT (Italian Wikipedia)
