= Cadillac Aurora =

Concept car developed by Cadillac

Overview
- Manufacturer: Cadillac (General Motors)
- Production: 1990

Body and chassis
- Class: Concept car
- Body style: 4-door sedan
- Layout: longitudinally-placed Front-engine, four-wheel-drive

Powertrain
- Engine: 4.5 L LW2 V8
- Transmission: 4-speed automatic

The Cadillac Aurora was a concept car manufactured by Cadillac; styled under the direction of GM Vice President of Design, Chuck Jordan; and presented at the 1990 Chicago Auto Show.

After the Aurora failed to enter production, its nameplate, powertrain concept and interior design concept were subsequently used by the Oldsmobile Aurora, presented in 1995. Its exterior design carried styling cues of the European Opel Omega B saloon released in 1994.

In 2024, Car and Driver published photographs of the Cadillac Aurora parked in a GM location reserved for vehicles to be imminently destroyed.

== Specifications ==
The Aurora used a 4.5 liter LW2 V8 engine from the Allanté producing 200 hp (149 kW) mated with a 4-speed automatic transmission and all-wheel drive with traction control. Motor Trend reported that the all-wheel-drive Aurora borrowed its framework from the front-drive DeVille. Unlike the DeVille, which positioned its engine transversely, the Aurora's engine was placed longitudinally.

== Media appearances ==
The concept appeared in a scene in the movie Demolition Man.
