= Opel Omega =

Large family car engineered and manufactured by Opel

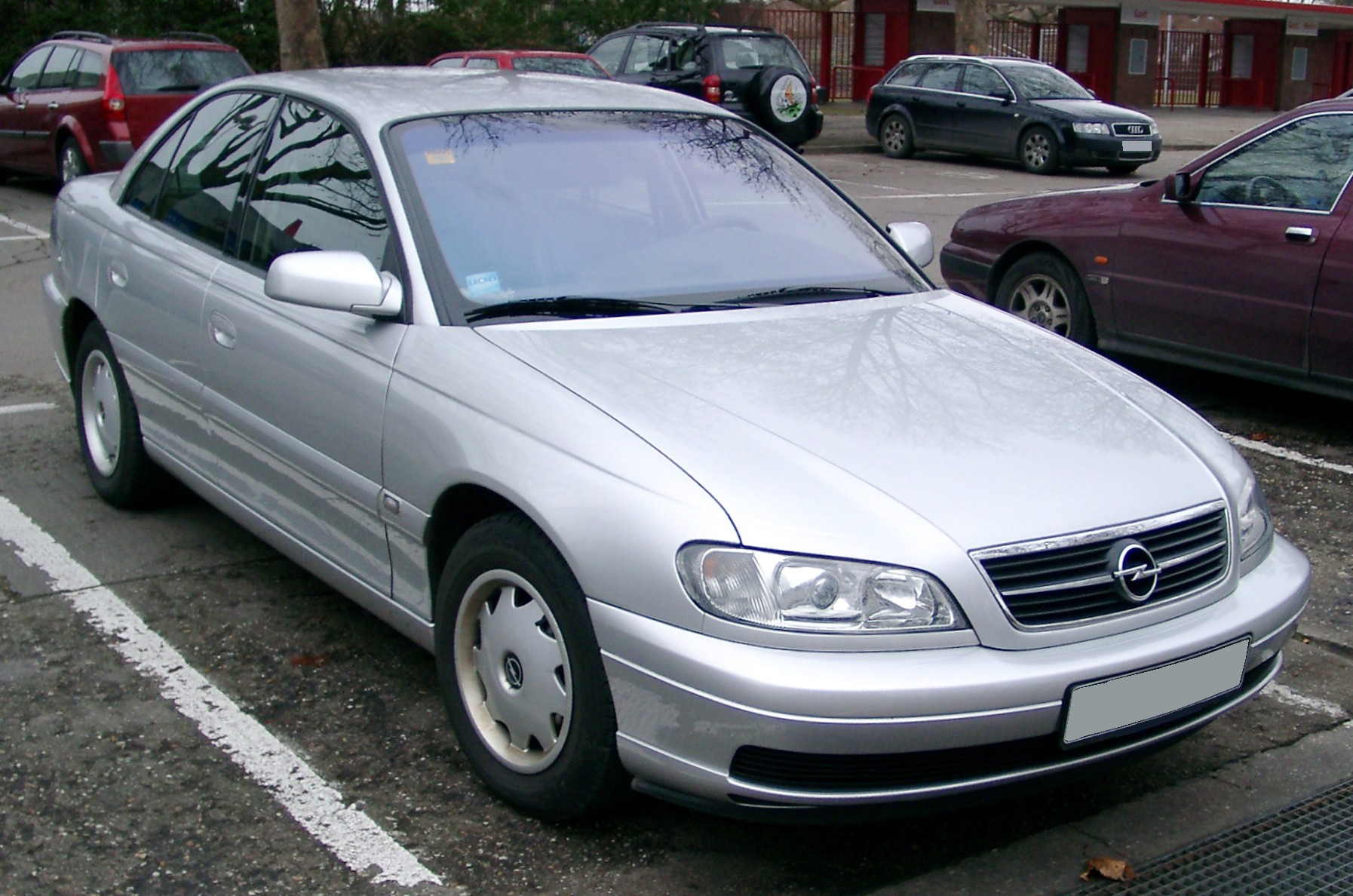
- Opel Omega B2 sedan

Overview
- Manufacturer: Opel (General Motors)
- Production: September 1986 – June 2003

Body and chassis
- Class: Executive car (E)
- Layout: FR layout
- Platform: GM V platform

Chronology
- Predecessor: Opel Rekord Series E (1986); Opel Commodore (1986); Opel Senator (1994); Vauxhall Carlton (1994)
- Successor: Opel Signum (indirect)

The Opel Omega is an executive car engineered and manufactured by German automaker Opel between 1986 and 2003. The first generation, the Omega A (1986–1994), superseded the Opel Rekord. It was voted European Car of the Year for 1987, and was available as a saloon or estate. The second generation, the Omega B, was manufactured from 1994 to 2003.

Rebadged variants of the Omega were marketed worldwide, including in North America as the Cadillac Catera, in Great Britain as the Vauxhall Omega, and South America as the Chevrolet Omega. As with the Rekord which preceded it, re-engineered versions of the Omega were manufactured in Australia from 1988 as the Holden Commodore (and its derivatives) since 1999. Commodore-based cars were in turn exported to South America as the Chevrolet Omega and to the Middle East as the Chevrolet Lumina.

Production of the Omega was discontinued in 2003. It was succeeded by the Opel Signum.

== Omega A (1986–1994) ==
Omega A
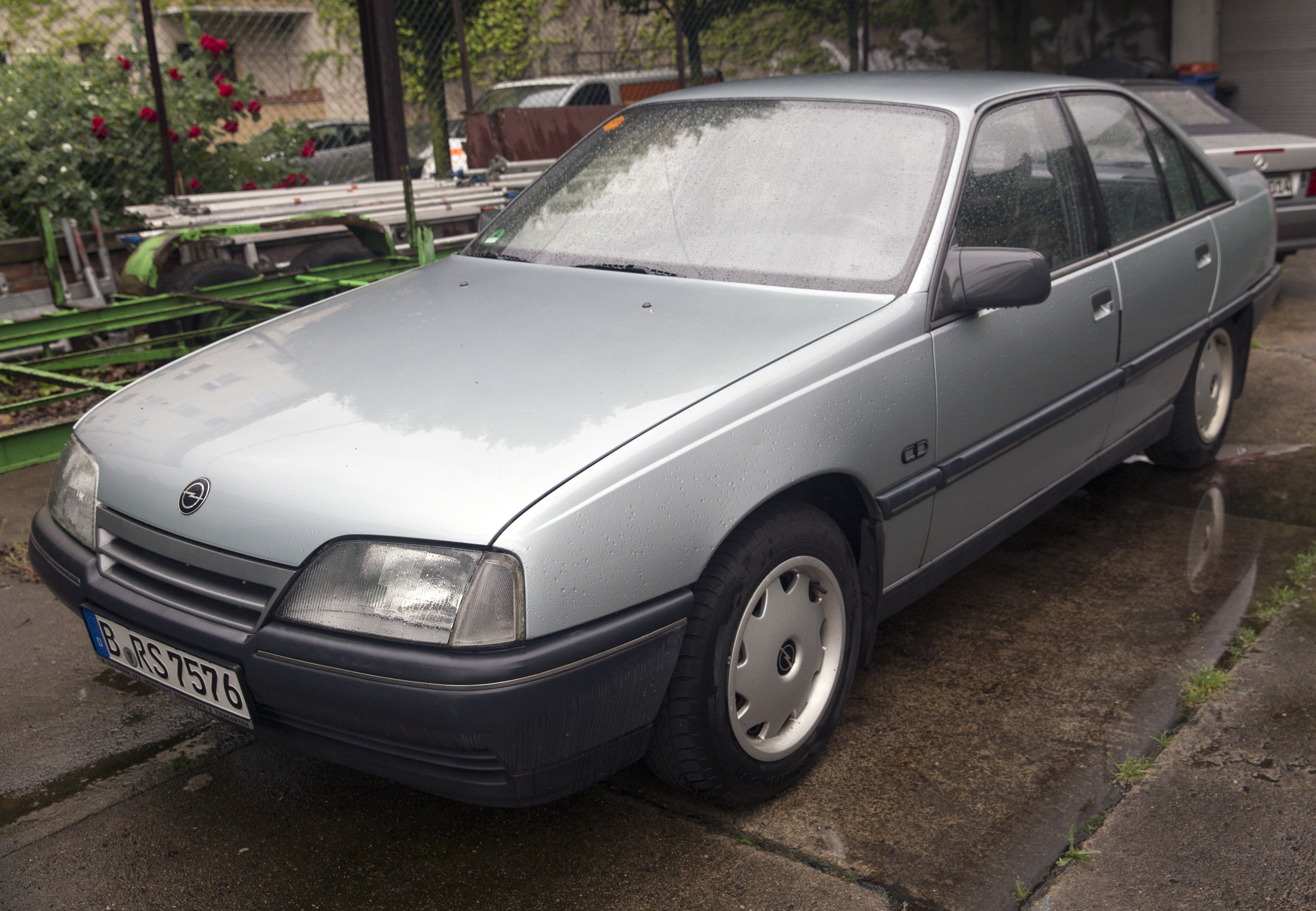
- 1986–1990 Opel Omega sedan

Overview
- Also called: Chevrolet Omega/Suprema; Vauxhall Carlton
- Production: September 1986 – August 1993; August 1992–1998 (Brazil)
- Assembly: Germany: Rüsselsheim; Brazil: São Caetano do Sul; Yugoslavia: Kikinda (IDA-Opel)

Body and chassis
- Body style: 4-door notchback saloon 5-door estate
- Related: Opel Senator B Holden Commodore (VN); Holden Commodore (VP); Holden Commodore (VR); Holden Commodore (VS)

Powertrain
- Engine: Petrol; 1.8 L Family II I4; 2.0 L Family II I4; 2.4 L C24NE I4; 2.6 L C26NE I6; 3.0 L CIH I6; 3.0 L Irmscher C30XEI I6 (Evo 500); 3.6 L Irmscher C36NE; 3.6 L C36GET twin-turbo I6 (Lotus Omega); 4.0 L Irmscher C40SE I6; Diesel; 2.3 L 23YD I4; 2.3 L 23YDT/23DTR Turbodiesel I4
- Transmission: 4-speed automatic 5-speed manual 6-speed manual (Lotus Omega)

Dimensions
- Wheelbase: 2,730 mm (107.5 in)
- Length: 4,687 mm (184.5 in); 4,730 mm (186.2 in) (estate)
- Width: 1,772 mm (69.8 in)
- Height: 1,445 mm (56.9 in); 1,480 mm (58.3 in) (estate)
- Curb weight: 1,200–1,459 kg (2,646–3,217 lb)

=== Development ===
The original Omega went into production in September 1986, as a replacement for the final version of the Opel Rekord, which had been in production since 1978. Sales began in November. The body was designed as an evolution of the previous Opel design theme engineered more towards aerodynamics in view of higher fuel prices and the general drive towards more fuel efficiency. The result was a remarkable drag coefficient of 0.28 (0.32 for the Caravan). The whole development program cost 2.5 billion Deutschmarks or £1.5 billion. The UK market version of the final generation of Rekord had been marketed as the Vauxhall Carlton, and this nameplate was retained for the new car.

Late in 1986, it was voted European Car of the Year for 1987, ahead of the highly acclaimed new versions of the Audi 80 and BMW 7 Series. Compared to the Rekord, the Omega featured many modern technological advances, which were new to Opel in general, if not to the volume segment European automotive market. These included electronic engine management, ABS, on-board computer (which displayed parameters such as momentary fuel consumption or average speed), air-conditioned glove compartment, and even the then fashionable LCD instrument cluster (available in CD version from 1987, but dropped in 1991). More importantly, the Omega came with a self-diagnosis system (which is now a standard feature in present-day cars), whose output could be read by appropriately equipped, authorised service stations. The Omega was one of the first cars to offer (individual) heated seats in the rear.

=== Markets ===
The Omega was sold in most European countries, albeit with "Vauxhall Carlton" badging in the United Kingdom. In Japan, the Omega A (and Vectra) were the first Opels to be distributed by Isuzu Motors Ltd. rather than by long-standing importer Toho Motors (東邦モーターズ), beginning in July 1989. In the Isuzu lineup, it was slotted above the Isuzu Aska.

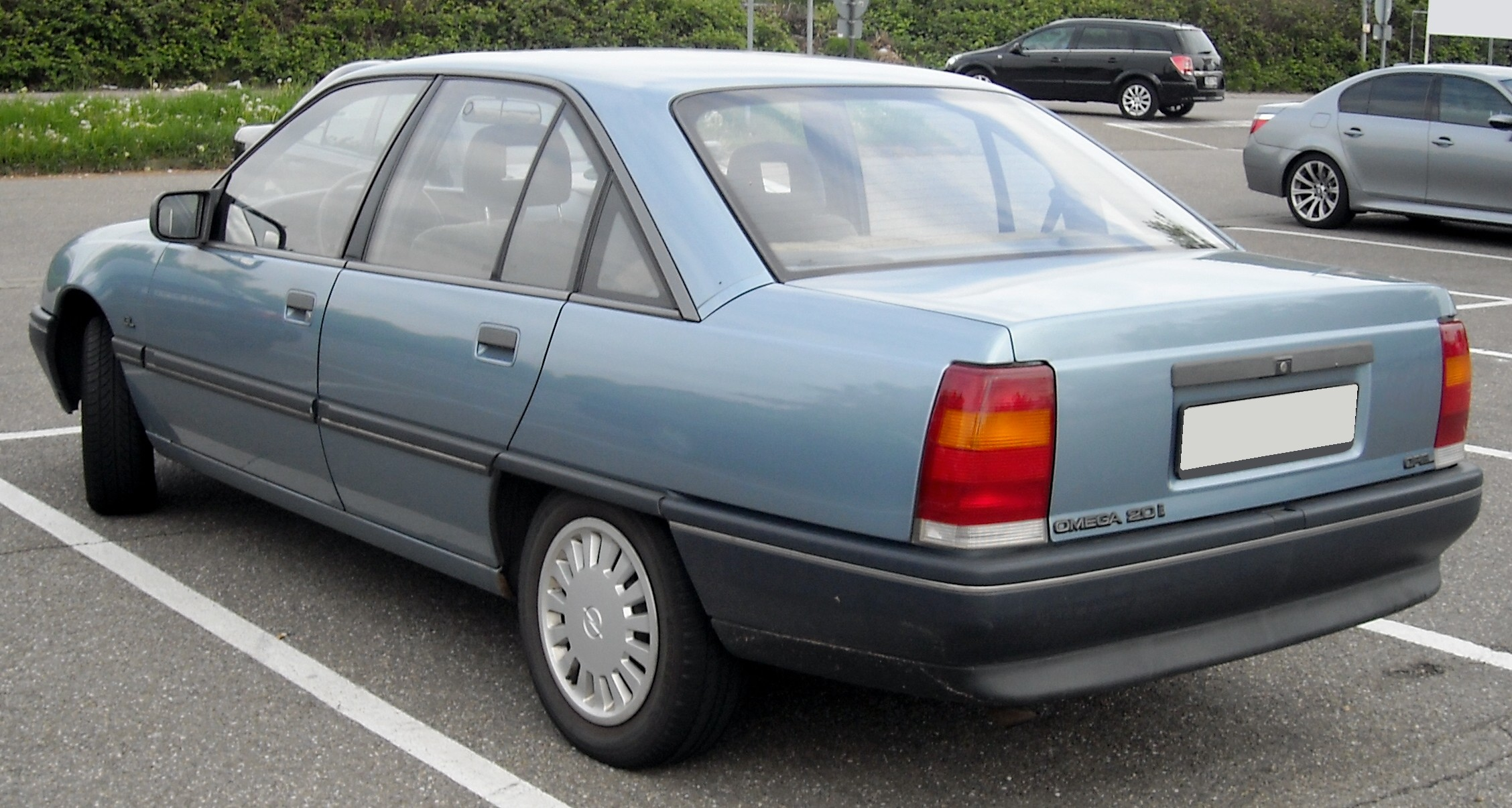
Opel Omega (1986–1990)

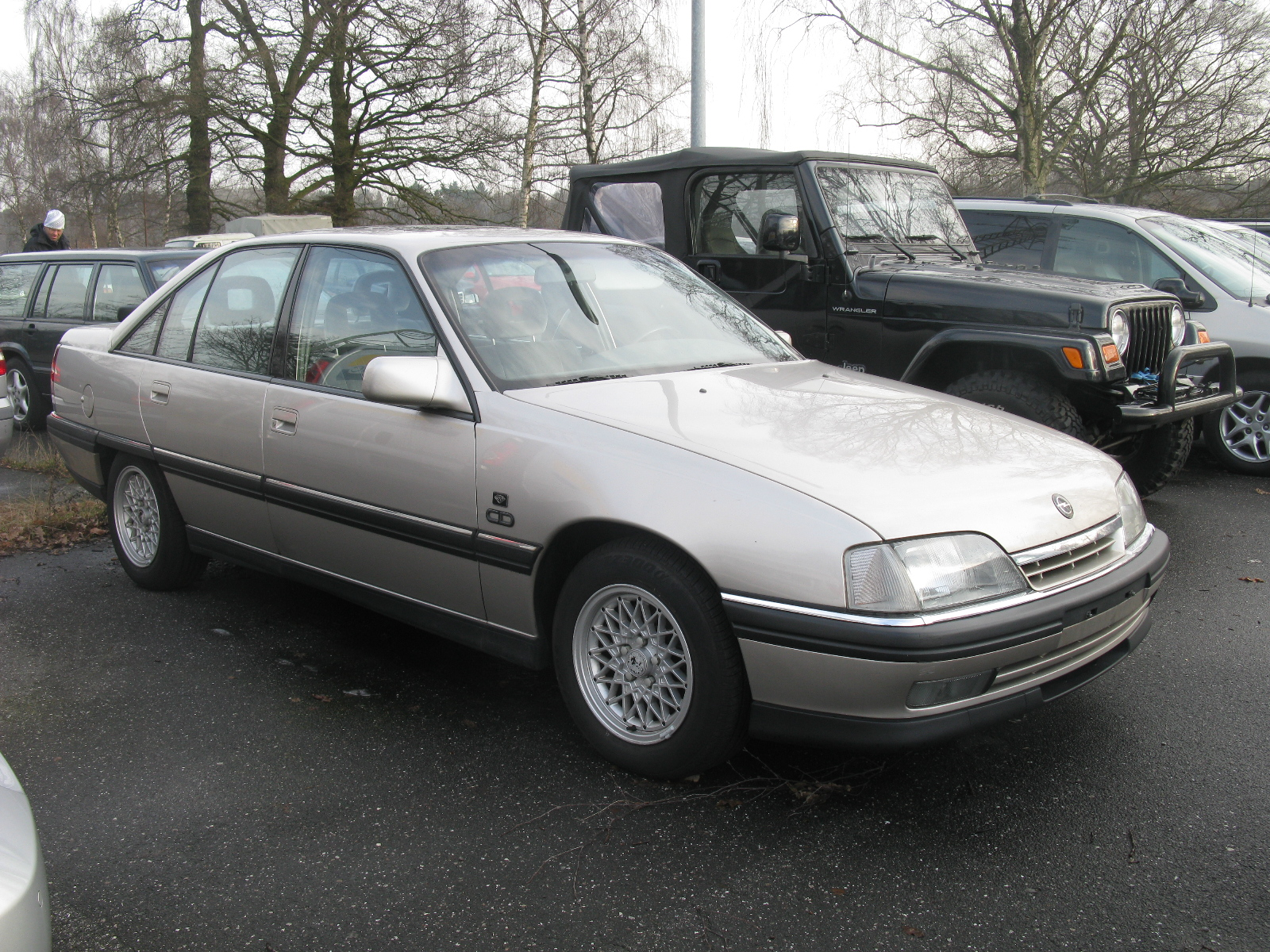
Opel Omega (1990–1993)

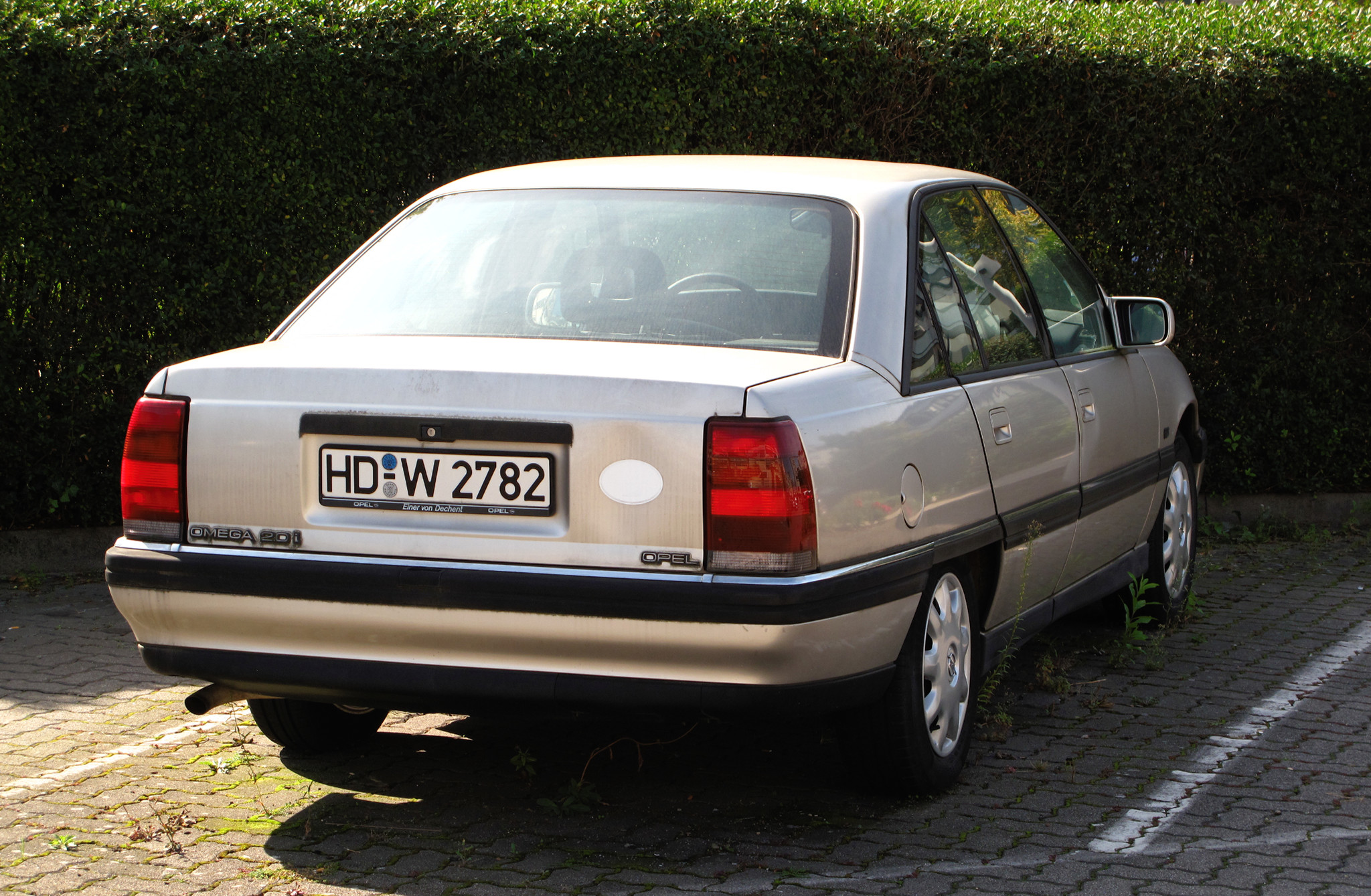
Opel Omega (1990–1993)

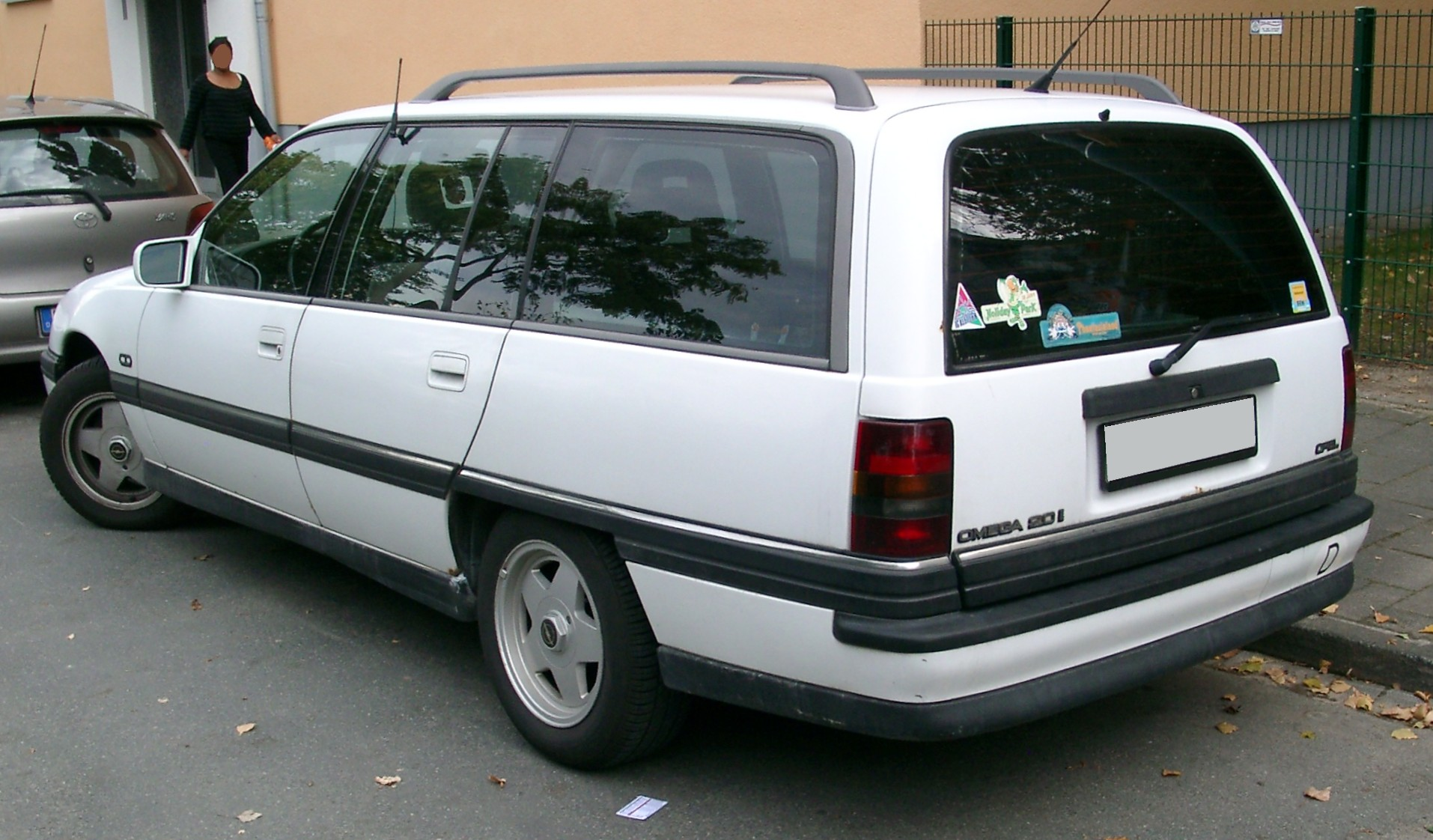
Opel Omega Caravan (1990–1993)

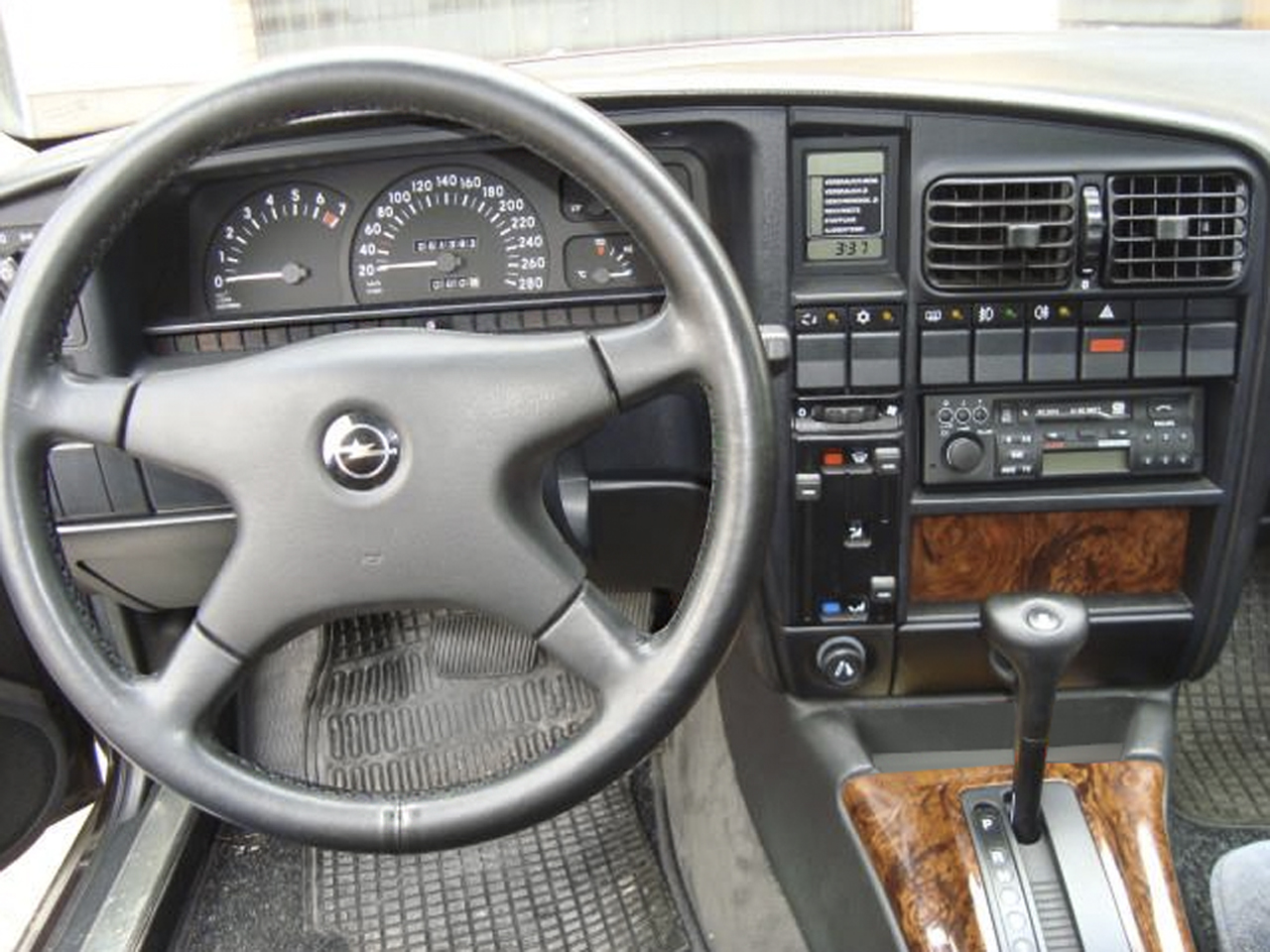
Interior

=== Engines ===
All the Omega models used a longitudinally mounted engine with a rear-wheel drive setup, with a five-speed manual transmission or four-speed automatic transmission. The engine range consisted of 1.8 L, 2.0 L, and 2.4 L four-cylinder units (as well as 2.0 L, 2.3 L diesel, and 2.3 L turbodiesel) to 2.6 L, 3.0 L, and 3.0 L-24v six-cylinder units. The 1.8 L and 2.0 L four-cylinder petrol engines were all based on the Family II design, whilst the six-cylinder units and the 2.4 L four-cylinder were based on the older Opel cam-in-head engine family.

In Brazil, the car was sold as the Chevrolet Omega and powered by 2.0 L I4 (C20NE and C20YE) or 3.0 L I6 (C30NE) Opel engines until 1994. Since the discontinuation of the Omega A in Germany, General Motors do Brasil needed new engines to continue production and the 2.0 L I4 was replaced by 2.2 L I4 engine (C22NE) with 116 PS (85 kW; 114 hp) and 197 N⋅m (145 lb⋅ft). The 3.0 L I6 was replaced by the locally produced 4.1 L (250ci) Chevrolet Straight-6 engine (C41GE) with 168 PS (124 kW; 166 hp) and 285 N⋅m (210 lb⋅ft). As fitted to the Omega, this engine was tuned by Lotus and equipped with multi port fuel injection. The Chevrolet Omega was produced until 1998.

Petrol
Engine	Cyl.	Power	Torque	Notes
18NV 1.8i 8V	I4	83 PS (61 kW; 82 hp)	135 N⋅m (100 lb⋅ft)	MY 1986–1987
18SV 1.8	I4	90 PS (66 kW; 89 hp)	148 N⋅m (109 lb⋅ft)	MY 1986–1987
E18NVR 1.8S	I4	88 PS (65 kW; 87 hp)	143 N⋅m (105 lb⋅ft)	MY 1987–1990
18SEH 1.8i	I4	115 PS (85 kW; 113 hp)	160 N⋅m (118 lb⋅ft)	MY 1986–1992
C20NEJ 2.0i	I4	99 PS (73 kW; 98 hp)	170 N⋅m (125 lb⋅ft)	MY 1990–1993
C20NEF 2.0i	I4	101 PS (74 kW; 100 hp)	158 N⋅m (117 lb⋅ft)	
C20NE 2.0i	I4	115 PS (85 kW; 113 hp)	170 N⋅m (125 lb⋅ft)	MY 1986–1993
20SE 2.0i	I4	122 PS (90 kW; 120 hp)	175 N⋅m (129 lb⋅ft)	MY 1986–1987
C24NE 2.4i	I4	125 PS (92 kW; 123 hp)	195 N⋅m (144 lb⋅ft)	MY 1988–1993
C26NE 2.6i 12V	I6	150 PS (110 kW; 148 hp)	220 N⋅m (162 lb⋅ft)	MY 1990–1993
C30LE 3.0i 12V	I6	156 PS (115 kW; 154 hp)	230 N⋅m (170 lb⋅ft)	MY 1986–1988 (Omega 3000)
30NE 3.0i 12V	I6	177 PS (130 kW; 175 hp)	240 N⋅m (177 lb⋅ft)	MY 1986–1987 (Omega 3000)
C30NE 3.0i 12V	I6	177 PS (130 kW; 175 hp)	240 N⋅m (177 lb⋅ft)	MY 1987–1993 (Omega 3000)
C30SEJ 3.0i 24V	I6	200 PS (147 kW; 197 hp)	265 N⋅m (195 lb⋅ft)	MY 1990–1993
C30SE 3.0i 24V	I6	204 PS (150 kW; 201 hp)	270 N⋅m (199 lb⋅ft)	MY 1989–1993 (Omega 3000)
C30XEI 3.0i 24V	I6	230 PS (169 kW; 227 hp)	280 N⋅m (207 lb⋅ft)	MY 1991–1993 (Irmscher for Omega Evo 500)
36NE 3.6i 12V	I6	200 PS (147 kW; 197 hp)		(Irmscher)
C36NE 3.6i 12V	I6	197 PS (145 kW; 194 hp)		(Irmscher)
C36NEI 3.6i 12V	I6	208 PS (153 kW; 205 hp)		(Irmscher)
C40SE 4.0i 24V	I6	272 PS (200 kW; 268 hp)	395 N⋅m (291 lb⋅ft)	MY 1991–1992 (Irmscher)
C36GET 3.6i 24V	I6	377 PS (277 kW; 372 hp)	557 N⋅m (411 lb⋅ft)	MY 1991–1992 (Omega Lotus)
Diesel
Engine	Cyl.	Power	Torque	Notes
23YD 2.3 D	I4	73 PS (54 kW; 72 hp)	138 N⋅m (102 lb⋅ft)	MY 1986–1993
23YDT 2.3 TD	I4	90 PS (66 kW; 89 hp)	190 N⋅m (140 lb⋅ft)	MY 1986–1988
23DTR 2.3 TD	I4	101 PS (74 kW; 100 hp)	218 N⋅m (161 lb⋅ft)	MY 1988–1993

=== Notable trim levels and special variants ===
The four basic trim levels were LS, GL, GLS, and CD (from least to most expensive). The base LS was clearly intended for the fleet market, with the sedan unavailable to individual customers in some markets. The LS Caravan was also available as a panel van with rear side windows covered, with body-coloured foil rather than replaced by solid panels.

For the 1991 model year, the Omega A was afforded a facelift, which encompassed slight alterations to front and rear fascias, as well as interior materials and additional sound dampening. The until then base 1.8 L engine was dropped. The LS and GLS trim levels were also dropped, while the CD was joined by Club and CD Diamant.

==== Omega Diamant ====
This options package was introduced in 1988, and could be added onto the GLS, LS, and CD trim versions. It included alloy wheels, metallic paint, tinted windows, stereo with cassette player, various leather trim in the interior, and a painted grille and door mirrors. It sold well and the package was kept after the facelift and a similar system with the same name was used for the Omega B.

==== Omega 3000 ====
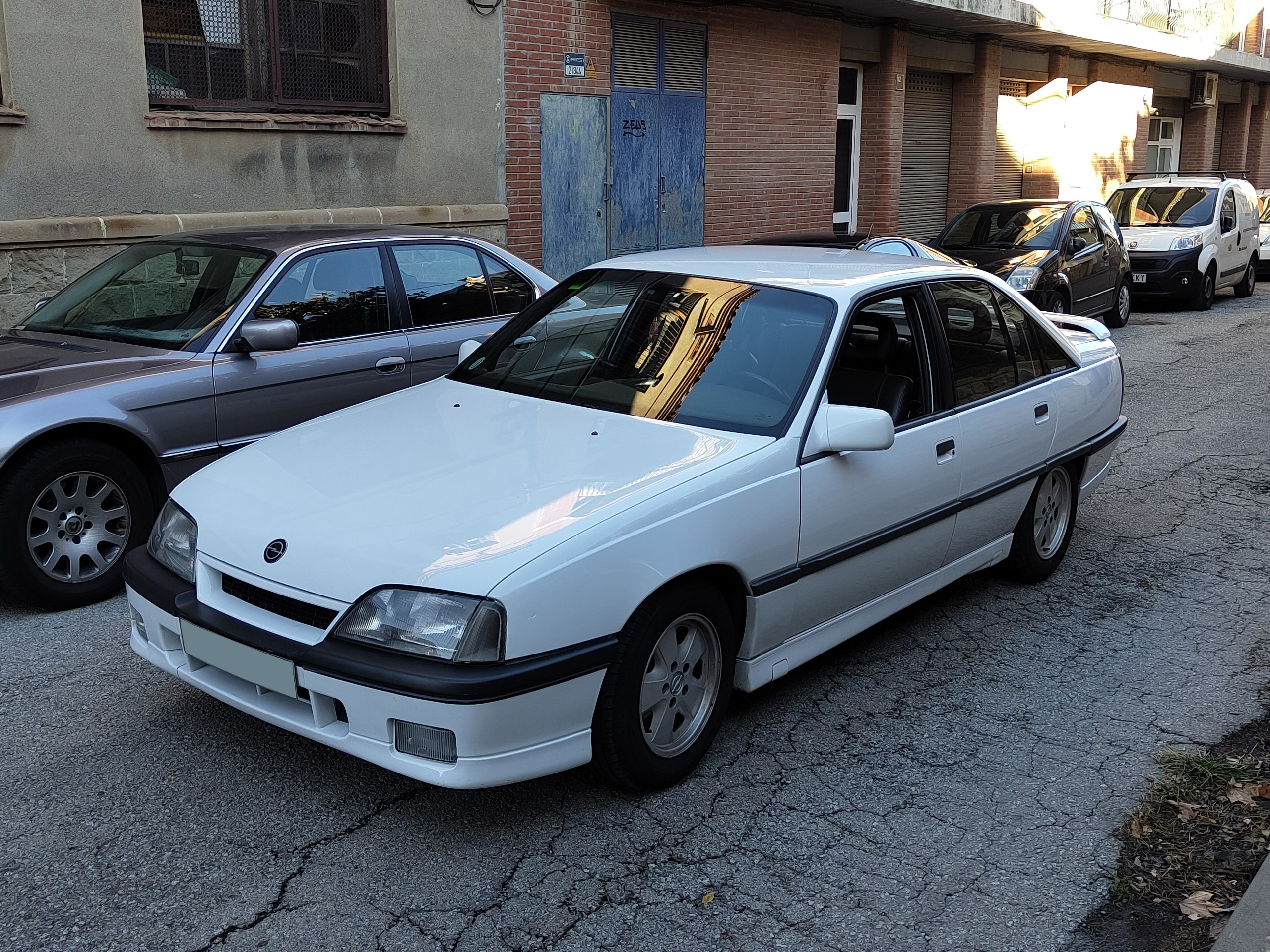
Opel Omega 3000 (1989)

The Omega 3000 was the sports version of the Omega A model range. It featured a straight-six, 3.0 litre, 12-valve engine, which produced 177 PS (130 kW). Other modifications from the base model included a lowered suspension and limited-slip differential, as well as different fascias and a rear spoiler. The car had a top speed of 220 km/h (137 mph), and accelerated from 0–100 km/h in 8.8 seconds. The catalyzed version of the engine originally only had 156 PS (115 kW). The uncatalyzed model was discontinued in August 1988. In countries where the Omega 3000 was sold as a Vauxhall, it was called the Carlton GSi 3000.

In October 1989, the Omega 3000 received an optional new engine with 24 valves, two overhead camshafts, and a variable intake manifold (Opel Dual Ram system). It also used a more advanced engine control unit. Power increased to 204 PS (150 kW), which increased top speed to 240 km/h (149 mph), and 0–100 km/h time dropped to 7.6 seconds. At the same time, output of the catalyzed two-valve version increased to 177 PS (130 kW), the same as the uncatalyzed original.

==== Omega Evolution 500 ====
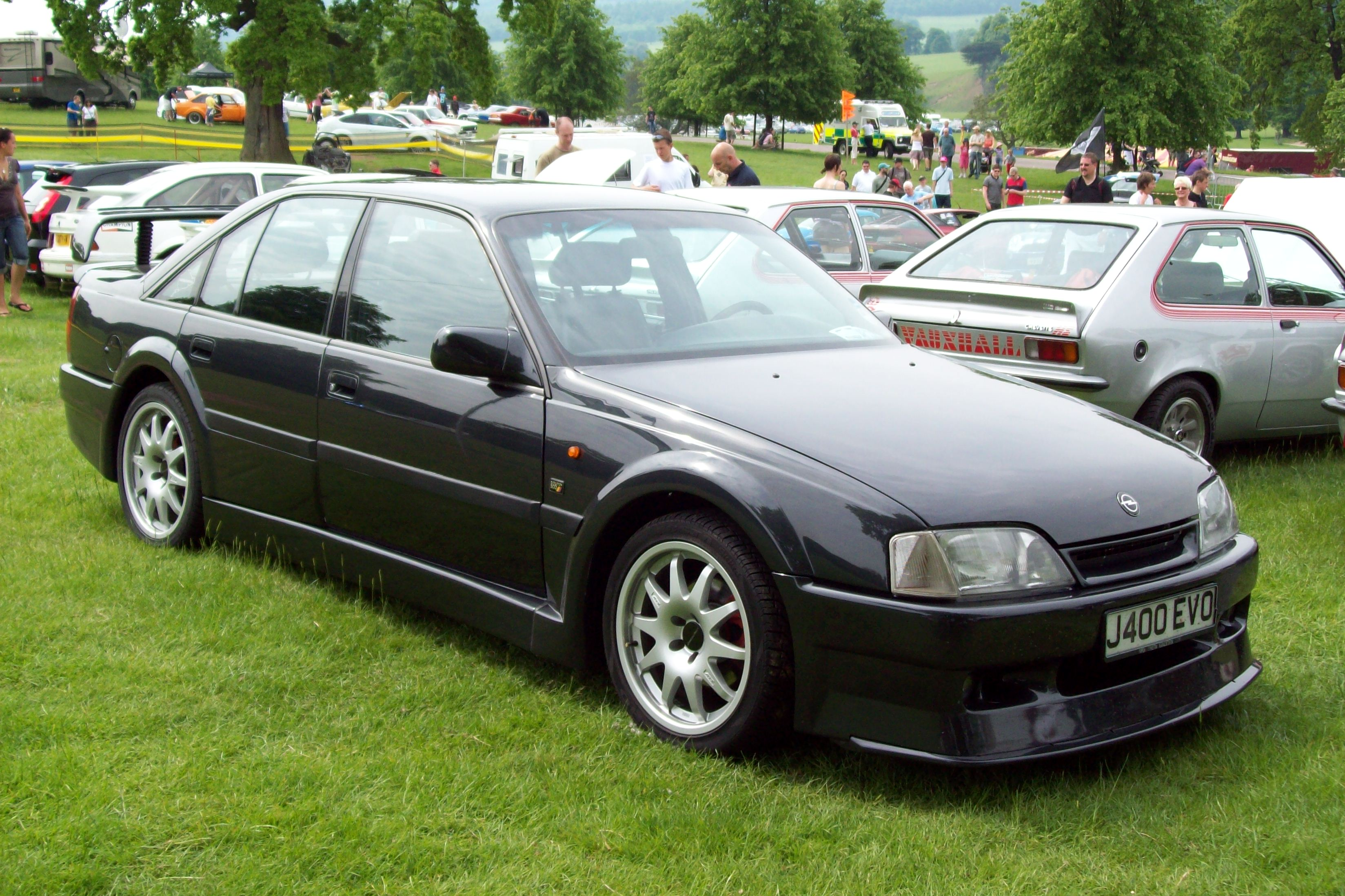
Omega Evolution 500

This was a limited series model produced together with Irmscher. 500 examples were built so that Opel could compete in the DTM. The car had a three-litre straight-six engine producing 230 PS (169 kW). The car accelerated from 0–100 km/h in 7.5 seconds and had a top speed of 249 km/h (155 mph). The racing version used on the track had 380 PS (279 kW), accelerated to 100 km/h (62 mph) in about 5 seconds, and could reach nearly 300 km/h (186 mph). It did not, however, achieve great success.

==== Lotus Omega ====
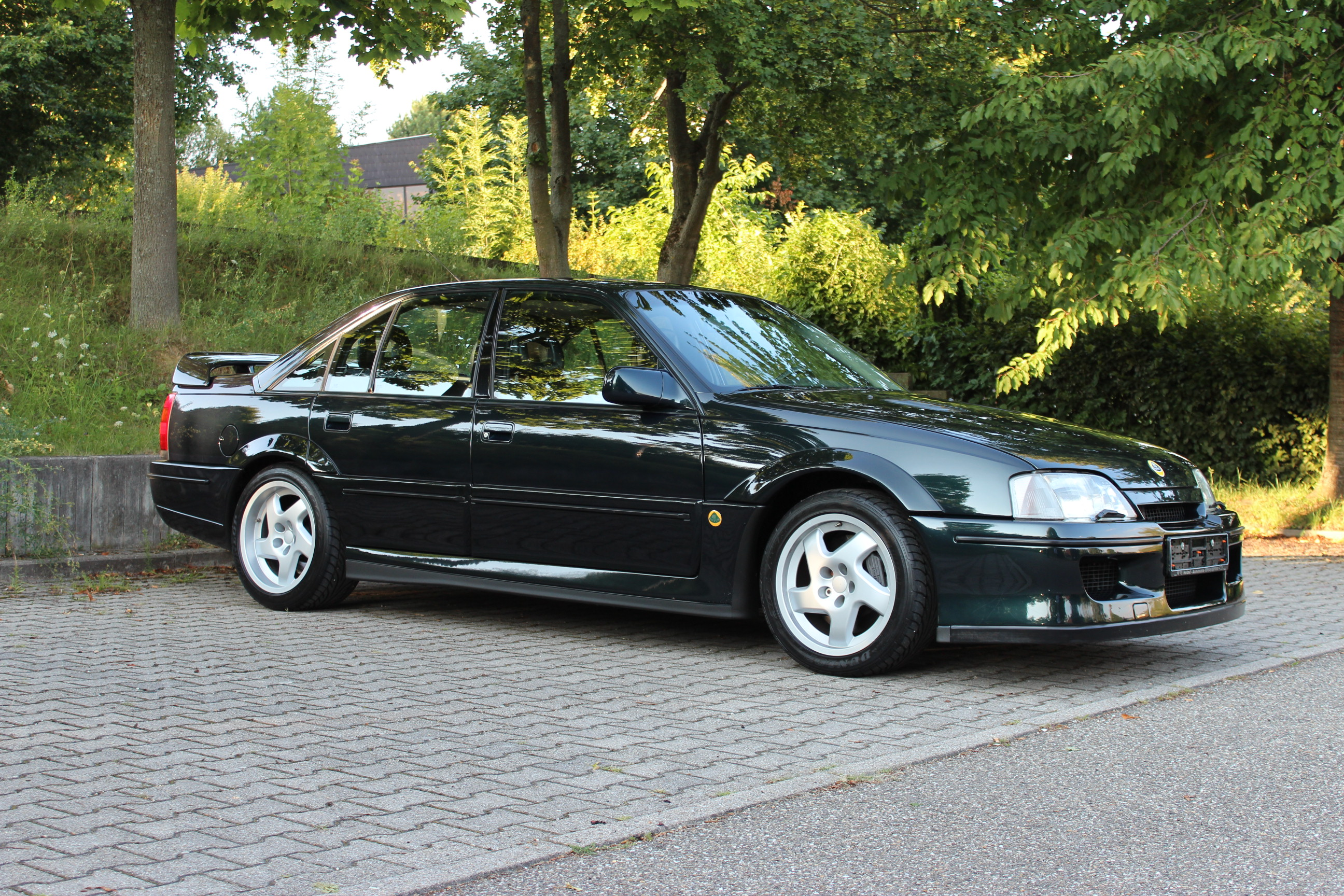
Lotus Omega

In 1989, Opel sanctioned a high-performance version of the Omega built in cooperation with Lotus. This version was named the Lotus Omega or Lotus Carlton depending on whether the base car was sold as an Opel Omega or Vauxhall Carlton in their respective European markets. The car was built using a variety of parts from other GM suppliers and manufacturers. The engine was based on Opel's standard 3.0-litre, 24-valve, which was handed to Lotus to modify.

As a result, engine capacity rose to 3.6 litres; in addition, two Garrett T25 turbochargers were installed along with a water-cooled intercooler. The engine management was also modified, and the ignition changed to an AC Delco type (same system as the Lotus Esprit uses). The result was a 377 bhp (281 kW; 382 PS) high-performance engine.

This Omega also inherited a larger differential from Holden's Commodore with a 45% LSD, whereas the gearbox was a six-speed manual ZF gearbox fitted to the Corvette ZR1. The tyres were custom made by Goodyear, and can be recognised by the small Greek letter Ω (Omega) on the side. These were required, as this car could reach 280 to 300 km/h (174 to 186 mph), which made this Omega the world's fastest production sedan at the time.

This was a controversial fact given that the other major German manufacturers producing high-performance cars had been fitting speed limiters to not allow maximum speeds higher than 250 km/h (155 mph). The 1,663 kg (3,666 lb) car accelerated from 0–100 km/h (62 mph) in 5.3 seconds and 0–160 km/h (99 mph) in 11.5 seconds.

== Omega B (1994–2003) ==
Omega B
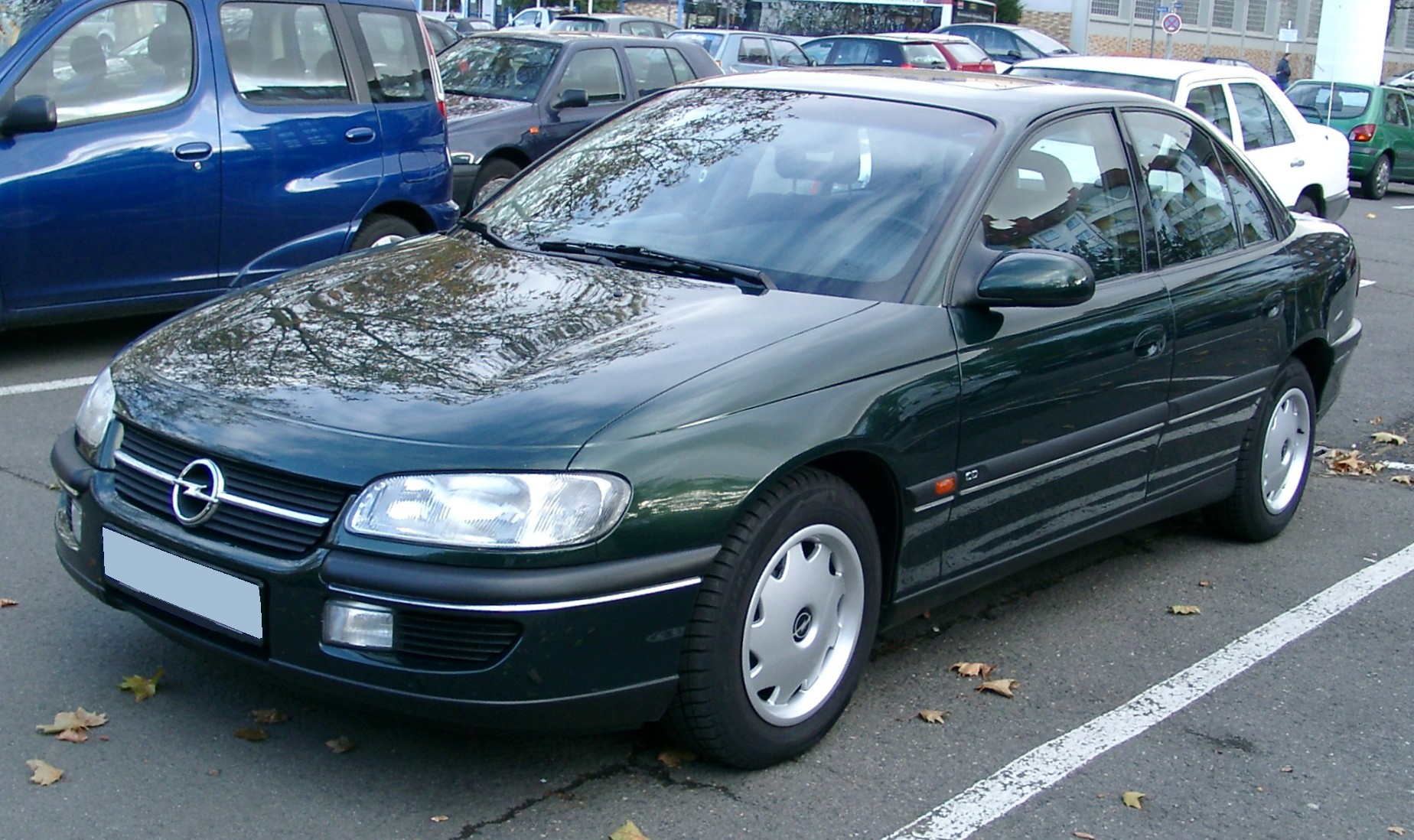

Overview
- Also called: Cadillac Catera; Vauxhall Omega
- Production: April 1994 – June 2003
- Assembly: Germany: Rüsselsheim; Thailand: Rayong (Opel/GM)
- Designer: Wayne Cherry; Herbert Killmer

Body and chassis
- Body style: 4-door notchback saloon 5-door estate
- Layout: Longitudinal engine FR layout
- Platform: GM V platform
- Related: Holden Commodore VT/VX/VY/VZ

Powertrain
- Engine: Petrol: 2.0 L X20SE I4; 2.0 L X20XEV DOHC 16V I4; 2.2 L Y22XE/Z22XE DOHC 16V I4; 2.5 L X25XE 24V V6; 2.6 L Y26SE V6; 3.0 L X30XE 24V V6; 3.2 L Y32SE V6; Diesel; 2.0 L X20DTH 16V DTI I4; 2.2 L Y22DTH 16V DTI I4; 2.5 L U25TD/X25TD TD I6; 2.5 L Y25DT DTI I6
- Transmission: 5-speed manual 4/5-speed automatic

Dimensions
- Wheelbase: 2,730 mm (107.5 in)
- Length: 4,790 mm (188.6 in); 4,820 mm (189.8 in) (estate); 4,898 mm (192.8 in) (B2)
- Width: 1,785 mm (70.3 in); B2: 1,776 mm (69.9 in)
- Height: 1,455 mm (57.3 in); 1,500 mm (59.1 in) (estate)
- Curb weight: 1,400–1,787 kg (3,086–3,940 lb)

The 1994 Omega B was an all new car with a modern exterior design, but a traditional rear-wheel drive chassis. The engine range was all new. Its MV6 model was rebadged and sold in the United States as Cadillac Catera between 1997 and 2001. The Omega B's platform was also modified to form the basis of the Australian third-generation Holden Commodore up to 2006, commencing with the 1997 VT series. This generation also helped succeed the Opel Senator as GM's executive car offering in European markets. The Vauxhall version was the first to feature the brand's corporate 'V' grille which also appeared on the facelifted MK3 Astra later in 1994.

This was 1995 Semperit Irish Car of the Year in Ireland, and 1995 RJC Car of the Year for Import Car of the Year in Japan.

Leaked images of a design studio mockup, featuring Opel badges and "D" plates, emerged in Europe in February 1990. The media at the time described the new saloon as coupé-like, speculating a release in 1992 or 1993. Meanwhile, the Cadillac Aurora (which also served as the basis for the Oldsmobile Aurora) presented by General Motors at the 1990 Chicago Auto Show in February, was the concept car that bore close resemblance to the Omega B's eventual design style.

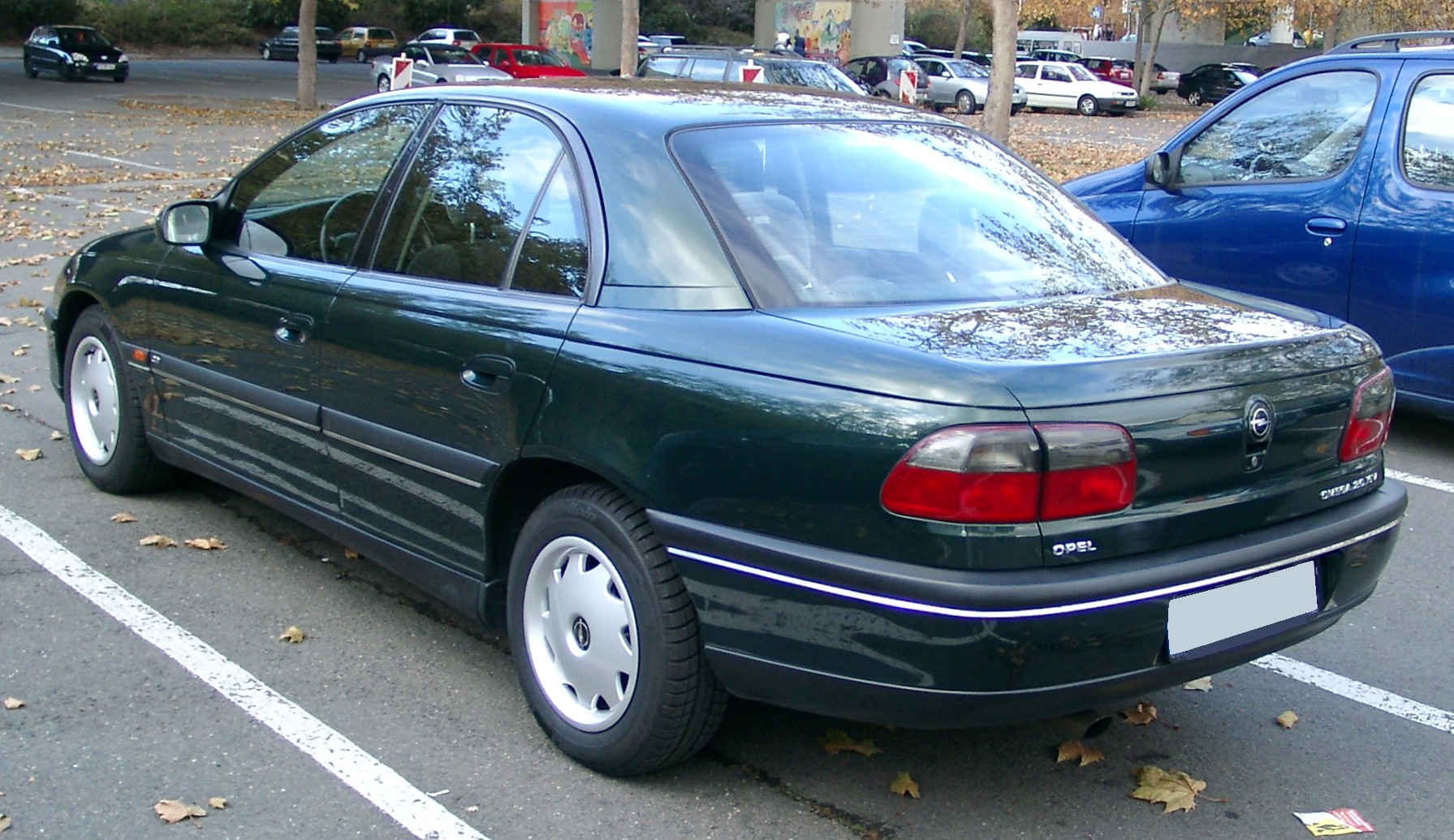
Rear view

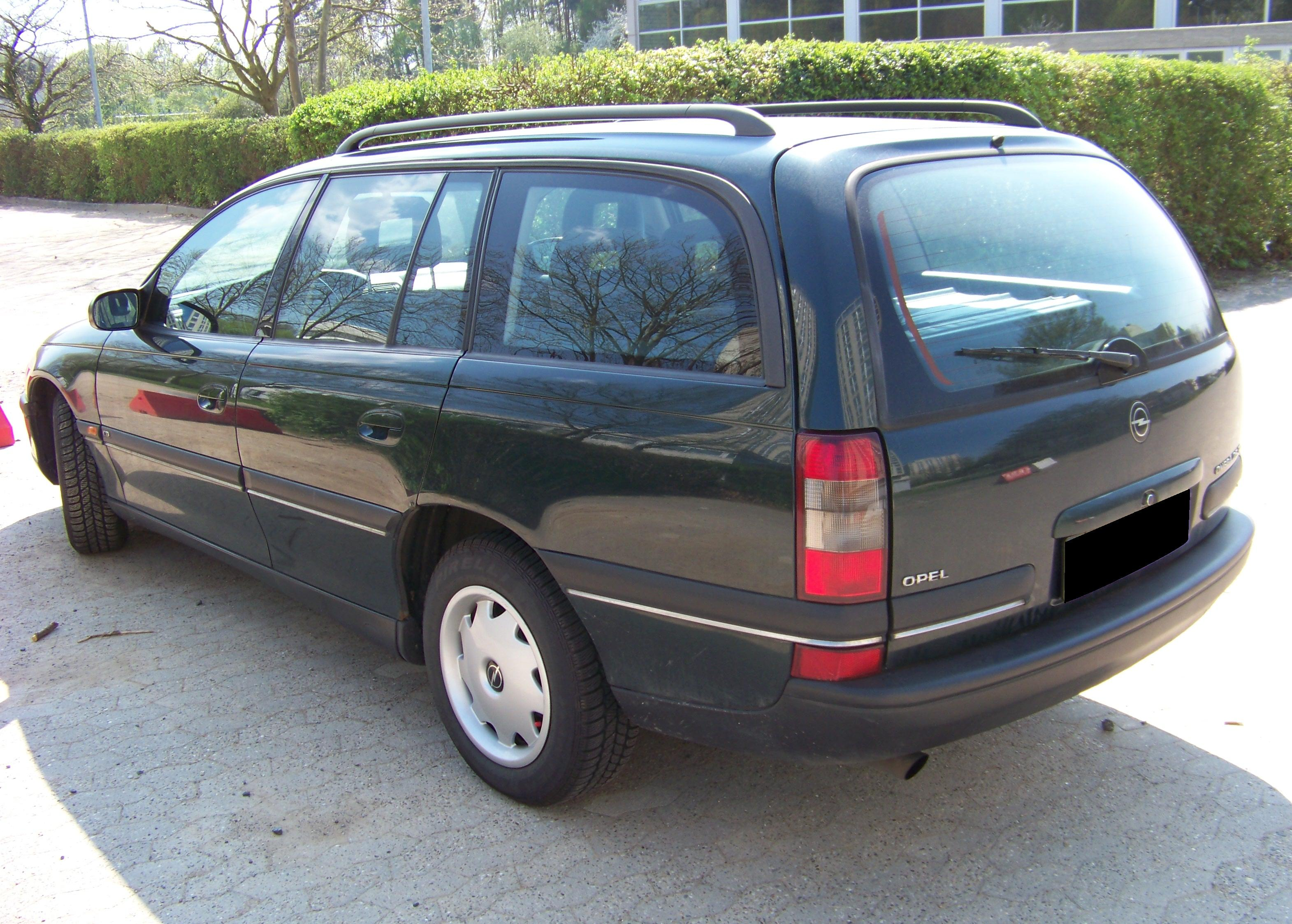
Opel Omega Caravan (1994–1999)

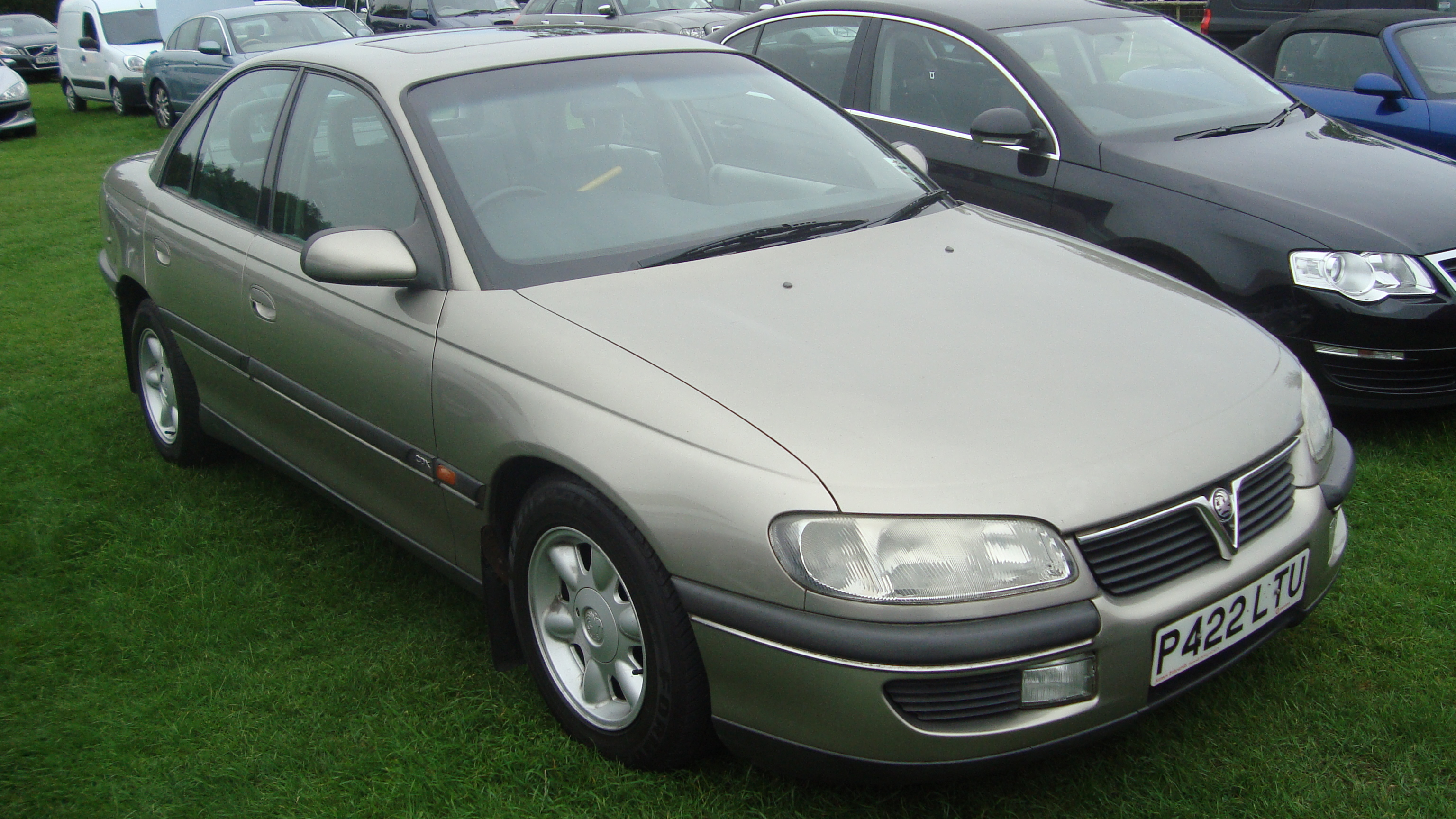
Vauxhall Omega CDX

=== Facelift (B2; 1999–2003) ===
The Omega B2 was launched in Autumn 1999 as a facelift of the B. It was distinguished by minor revisions to the front and rear styling, centre console, and the introduction of an electronic stability program. Gradually, new engines of slightly larger displacement also replaced the earlier ones; the new ones were generally Euro 3 emissions compliant.

Major changes:

- bonnet (grille now integrated with bonnet)
- Bumper fascias and bodyside mouldings
- Taillights
- Side mirrors
- New designs of alloy wheels
- Brand new central console with GPS, air conditioning, and controls
- Electronic stability program
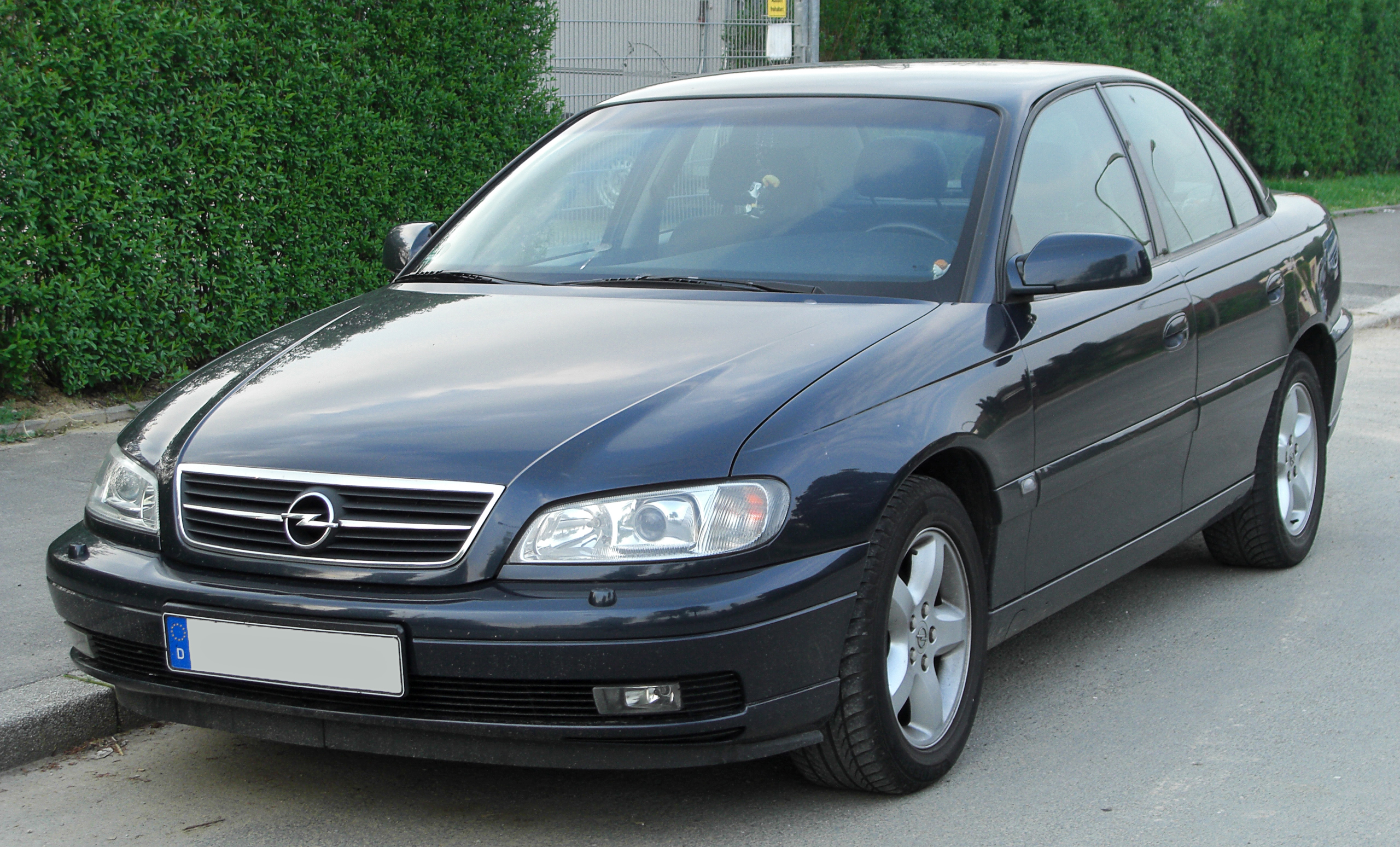
Front view

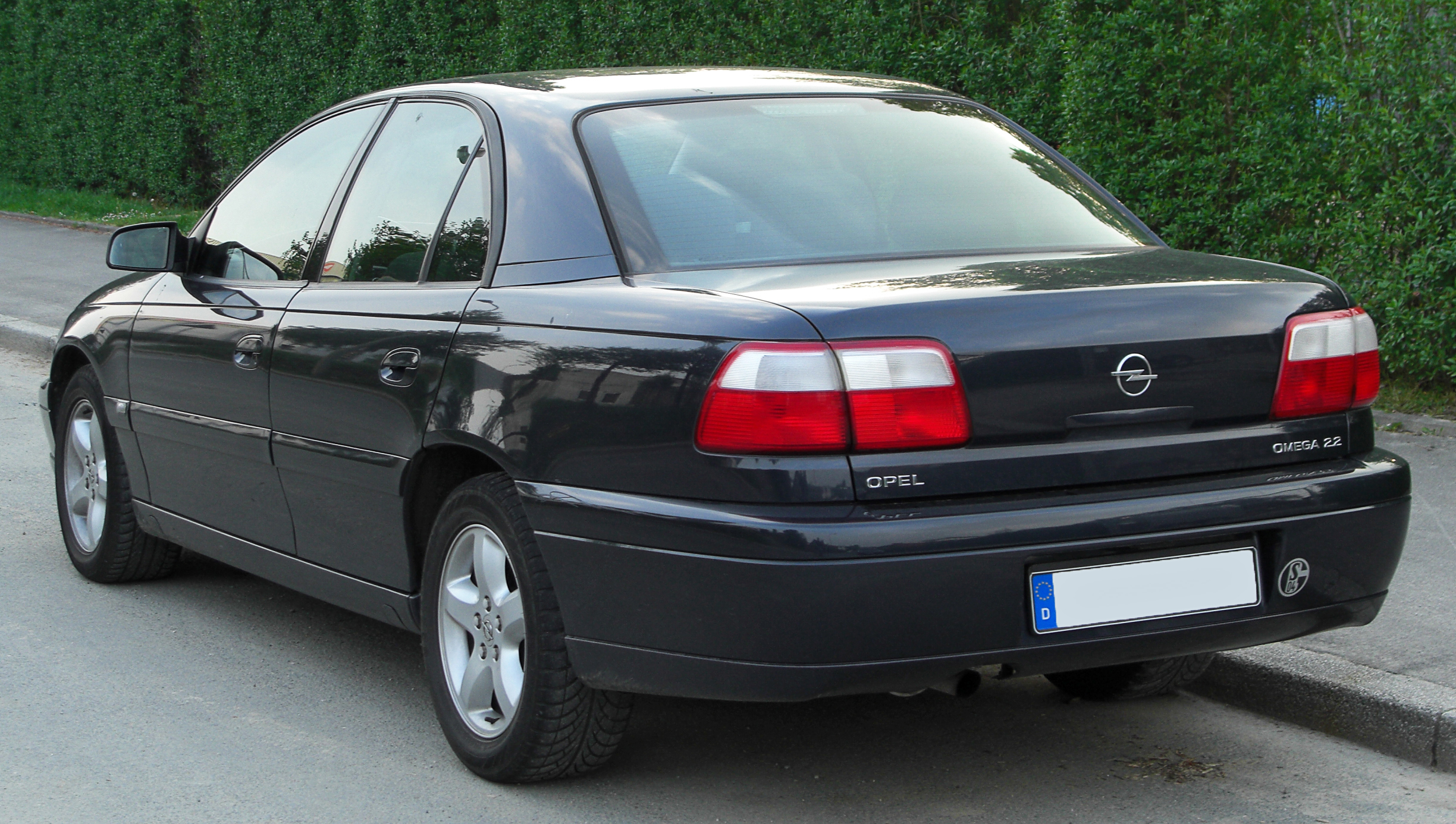
Rear view

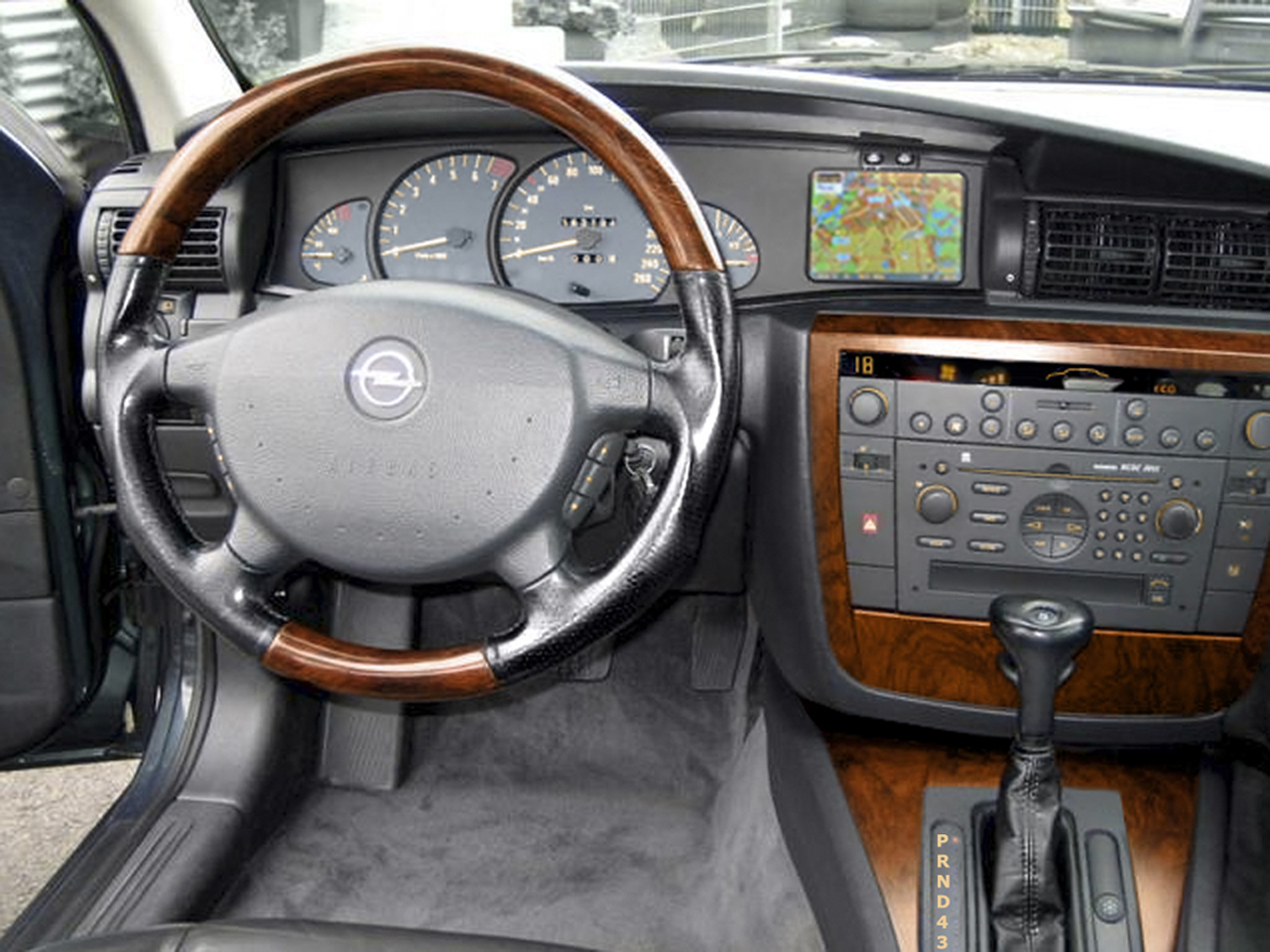
Interior

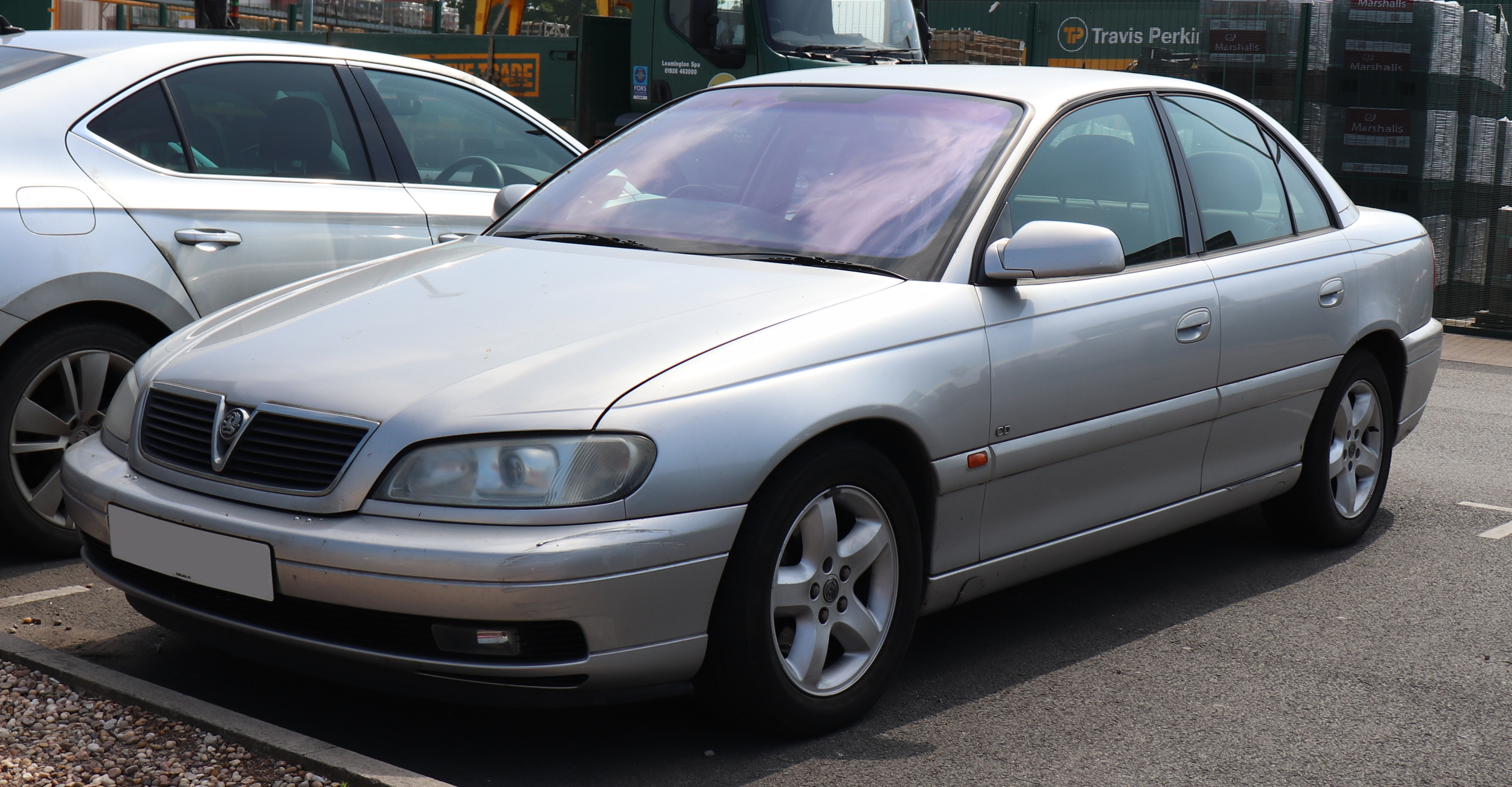
Vauxhall Omega

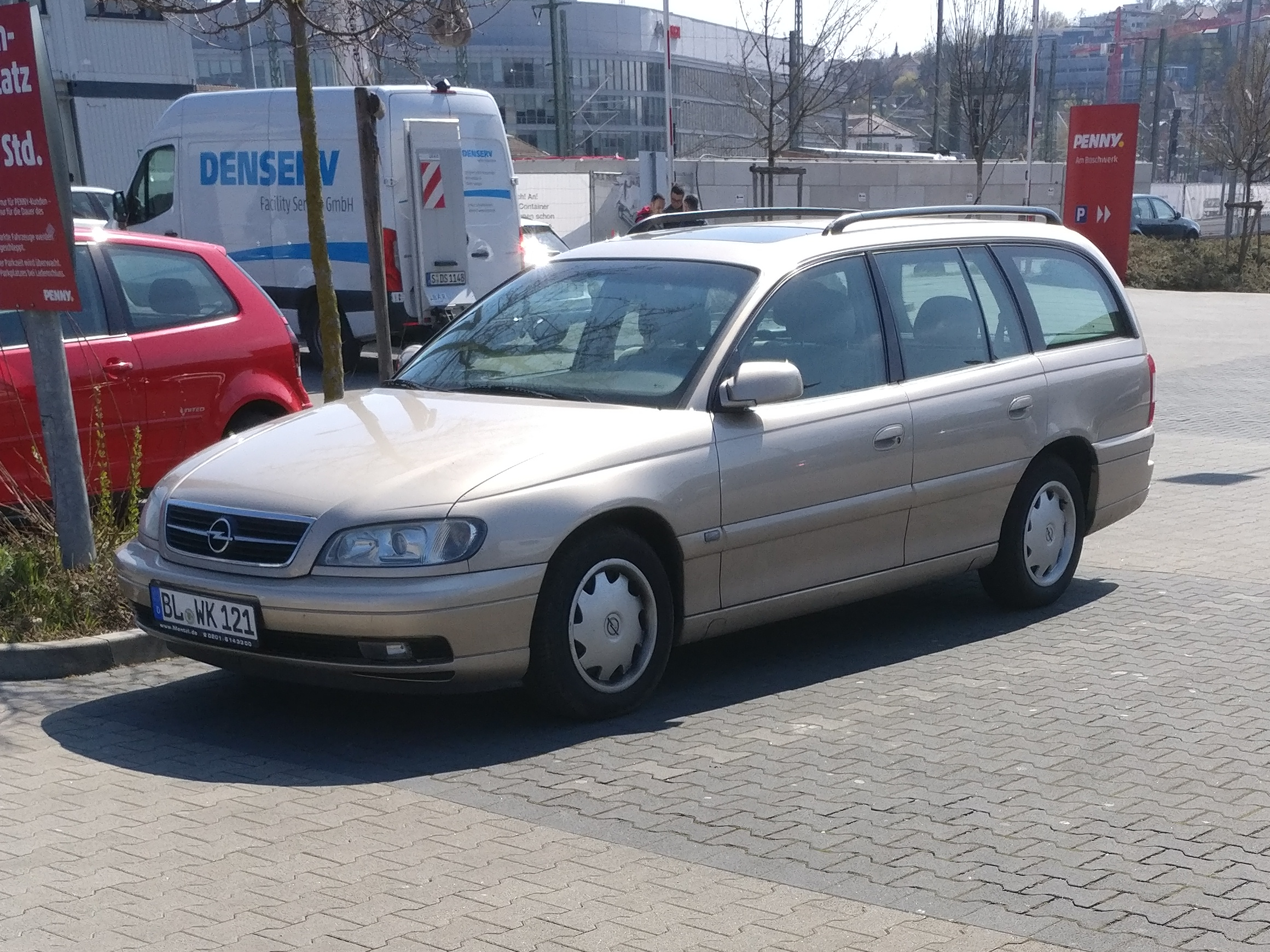
Opel Omega Caravan (1999-2003) Front view

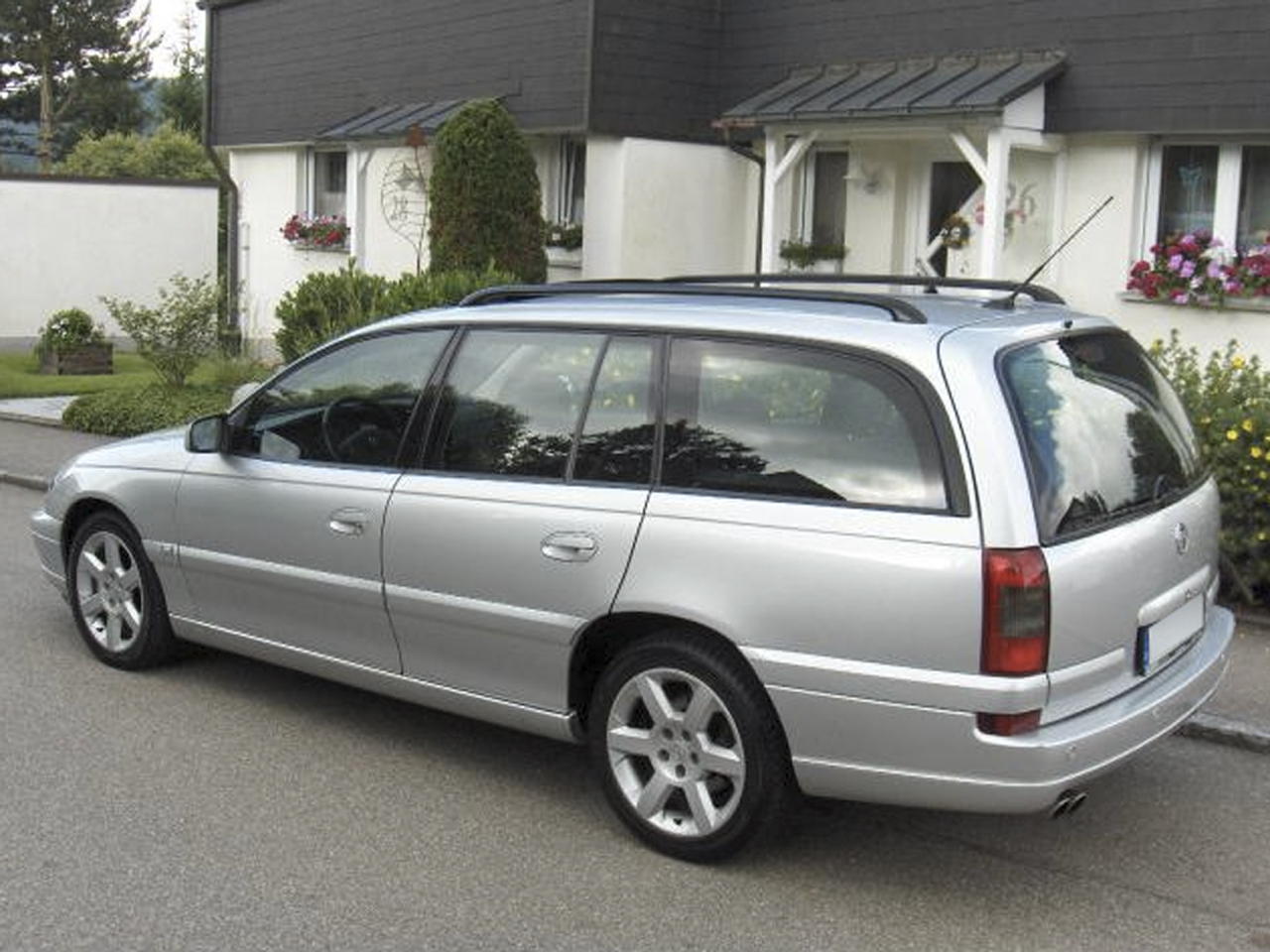
Opel Omega Caravan (1999-2003) Rear view

=== Engines ===
The engines were not a major departure from the Omega A, aside from the shift from Opel's own (outdated) 2.3-liter diesel to BMW's M51 turbocharged inline-six. Originally with the model code U25DT, this was updated to the Euro 2 compliant X25DT engine during 1996.

In late 1999, the Omega received a facelift and a 2.2 L 16-valve engine was added to the range as an eventual replacement for the 2.0 L which was discontinued within a year.

The following year, a 3.2 L V6 engine replaced the 3.0 L V6 unit, and a 2.6 L V6 engine replaced the 2.5 L V6 unit. 2001 also brought a brand new diesel 2.5 DTI (M57) engine from BMW, with a "common rail" fuel system.

Engine	Cyl.	cc	Power	Torque	Notes
X20SE 2.0i 8V	I4	1998	116 PS (85 kW; 114 hp)	172 N⋅m (127 lb⋅ft)	1994–1999
X20XEV 2.0i 16V	I4	1998	136 PS (100 kW; 134 hp)	185 N⋅m (136 lb⋅ft)	1994–1999
Y22XE 2.2i 16V	I4	2198	145 PS (107 kW; 143 hp)	205 N⋅m (151 lb⋅ft)	1999–2000
Z22XE 2.2i 16V	I4	2198	145 PS (107 kW; 143 hp)	205 N⋅m (151 lb⋅ft)	2000–2003
X25XE 2.5i 24V	V6	2498	170 PS (125 kW; 168 hp)	227 N⋅m (167 lb⋅ft)	1994–2000
Y26SE 2.6 24V	V6	2597	180 PS (132 kW; 178 hp)	240 N⋅m (177 lb⋅ft)	2001–2003
X30XE 3.0i 24V	V6	2962	211 PS (155 kW; 208 hp)	270 N⋅m (199 lb⋅ft)	1994–2000
Y32SE 3.2 24V	V6	3175	218 PS (160 kW; 215 hp)	290 N⋅m (214 lb⋅ft)	2001–2003
Diesel
Engine	Cyl.	cc	Power	Torque	Notes
X20DTH 2.0 DTI 16V	I4	1995	101 PS (74 kW; 100 hp)	205 N⋅m (151 lb⋅ft)	1998–2000
Y22DTH 2.2 DTI 16V	I4	2172	120 PS (88 kW; 118 hp)	280 N⋅m (207 lb⋅ft)	2000–2003
U25DT/X25DT 2.5 TD	I6	2497	130 PS (96 kW; 128 hp)	250 N⋅m (184 lb⋅ft)	1994–2000
Y25DT 2.5 DTI	I6	2497	150 PS (110 kW; 148 hp)	300 N⋅m (221 lb⋅ft)	2001–2003

== Omega V8 (prototypes) ==
Omega V8 (prototypes)

Overview
- Manufacturer: Opel
- Production: 1999–2001 (prototypes only)
- Assembly: Germany: Rüsselsheim

Powertrain
- Engine: 5.7 L LS1 V8
- Transmission: 5-speed automatic

Dimensions
- Wheelbase: 2,730 mm (107.5 in)
- Length: 4,898 mm (192.8 in)
- Width: 1,775 mm (69.9 in)
- Height: 1,455 mm (57.3 in), 1,540 mm (60.6 in) (estate)
- Curb weight: 1,726 kg (3,805 lb)

In an effort to better compete with the BMW 5 Series and the Mercedes-Benz E-Class, Opel decided to install a V8 engine into the Omega. Prototypes of sedan and station wagon versions were built (equipped with multimedia systems, and named V8.com).

=== Omega V8.com ===
The V8.com concept car project was meant to be a "mobile office" it was built on Omega station wagon, which was elongated by 130 mm, to provide more space for the passengers and additional equipment; it contained separate 9.5-inch LCD screens for all passengers, Internet access, and integrated video conference mobile phone system with separate cameras and microphones providing passengers hands-free operation – hence the name.

The car was also equipped with xenon headlights, and Advanced Frontlighting System, automatically adjustable to the road conditions. It was powered by a GM LS1 V8 engine.

The car debuted at Frankfurt Motor Show in September 1999.

=== Omega V8 ===
Opel was planning to upgrade its flagship Omega model with the GM LS1 V8 engine. Unlike the V8.com which was a concept car, this model was intended to go into serial production. The Omega V8 was shown publicly for the first time at the 70th Geneva Motor Show (2–12 March 2000). The V8-engined version was to be put on sale in Autumn 2000, but it was cancelled after 32 pre-series cars had been completed.

The reasons for cancelling production plans were concerns regarding the transmission and about whether the engine was vollgasfest (German, "full throttle resistant"). The engine might overheat and be damaged if driven flat out on the Autobahn for long periods of time. While cooling was resolved by using the larger Holden Commodore radiator, the transmission problem remained. The Chevrolet Corvette (C5) had a transaxle transmission; the only gearbox suitable for the Omega V8 was the GM 4L60-E 4-speed automatic transmission. However, the transmission's flexplate repeatedly broke at 250 km/h (155 mph) during the vollgasfest test. The solution to this problem would take longer than the planned production of the Omega.

Holden did equip its Commodore (which was a reengineered Omega for Australian market) with the same V8 engine. A version of this platform was used for the Holden Monaro, which was marketed in the United States as the fourth-generation Pontiac GTO, and in the United Kingdom as the Vauxhall Monaro.

== Worldwide markets ==
- In the United Kingdom, the Omega A was marketed as the second-generation Vauxhall Carlton (the first-generation Vauxhall Carlton having been a rebadged Opel Rekord E2) and the Omega B generation as Vauxhall Omega. Between 2001 and 2007, Vauxhall sold the Australian-made Monaro coupe, which was derived from the Holden Commodore, itself based on the Omega B platform.
- In Brazil, between August 1992 and August 1998, the Omega A was built and marketed as a Chevrolet Omega sedan or Omega Suprema in station wagon form (station wagon production ended in 1996). Between 1999 and 2006, this Chevrolet was the Omega B-derived Holden Commodore imported from Australia.
- In North America, a badge-engineered version of the Omega B and Omega B FL was marketed as the Cadillac Catera. Between 2004 and 2006, Pontiac reintroduced and sold its GTO as a coupe based on the Australian-made Monaro, which was derived from the Holden Commodore.
- In Australia, reengineered versions of the Opel Omega A were manufactured by Holden (a GM subsidiary) as the second generation Commodore and its derivates (including long wheelbase wagons, utility and luxury sedans, Statesman and Caprice) between 1988 and 1997. Between 1997 and 2007, Holden instead adapted the Omega B for its third generation as the Commodore and derivates, which now also included the Monaro coupe.

These Australian sedans are larger in all body dimensions and have featured less sophisticated suspension designs, different interior styling, and powertrains ranging from a Buick-derived 3.8-litre V6 between 1988 and 2003 or 5.0-litre V8 between 1988 and 1999, both manufactured by Holden, to a new 3.6-litre V6 from 2003 also built and exported by Holden and fully imported Chevrolet V8 engines, beginning with a 5.7 litre version in 1999, upgraded to a 260 kW 6.0 litre version in 2006. These vehicles were equally available in New Zealand.

- Since 1999, the Omega B based second generation Holden Commodore and its derivatives were exported to North America, Brazil, and the United Kingdom in sedan and coupe form as noted above, but also as a Chevrolet Lumina in the Middle East and South Africa. The Holden Commodore's 1999 long-wheelbase luxury derivative, WH-series Statesman/Caprice, was also exported to the Middle East as the fifth-generation Holden Caprice. In 2005, as the WK Statesman, this vehicle was sold in China as the Buick Royaum and in Korea as the Daewoo Statesman.
- The Omega was one of the first models introduced by Opel after their return to the Philippines in 1997. Shortly after the brand's discontinuation in the Philippine market, it was replaced by the Chevrolet Lumina, but instead of being based on the Holden Commodore like other markets, the Philippines received a rebadged Chinese-market Buick Regal sourced from Shanghai GM.

=== End of the Omega ===
In the United Kingdom, the Vauxhall Omega proved to be a successful model, despite being slated in many reviews for heavy depreciation and unreliability. Omegas and Carltons were a regular sight on United Kingdom roads, sporting police livery and as covert traffic surveillance cars. However, just four years after the introduction of its latest incarnation, Omega B2, and seventeen years since introduction of Omega A, production of this model ended. On 25 June 2003, the last Omega rolled out of the factory in Rüsselsheim – it was a silver 3.2 L V6 Omega B2, number 797,011.

Following the demise of its direct rivals, the Ford Scorpio and Rover 800, the former due to its controversial styling, Opel/Vauxhall found themselves competing against BMW's 5 Series, with minimal sales success. Apart from the Australian re-engineered Holden Commodore models that carried on until 2006 for the sedan (wagons and utilities until 2007), production of the Omega ended in 2003. The position that the Omega held as Opel's flagship model (after the demise of the Senator) would be taken over by the smaller Opel Signum which used an extended-length platform of the Opel Vectra and incorporated practical features of both MPVs and station wagons into one package. Remaining stocks were sold into 2004. In the Philippines, the Omega was replaced by the Chevrolet Lumina.

Stories and photographs of a "new" successor appeared in the motoring press one year later. In the case of Auto Express, though, its October 2004 article simply featured the Holden Torana TT36 concept car, which itself previewed the 2006 Holden Commodore. Nevertheless, Holden contributed in the Omega badge remaining alive by it, for the entry-level model of its new Commodore. Unlike prior models since 1978, this new Holden was no longer based on an Omega platform. Ironically, a version of this Commodore would get exported to the UK market as the Vauxhall VXR8 from 2007 to 2017, effectively becoming the flagship of the brand. Being a high-performance sports sedan, it was the first such vehicle in Vauxhall's lineup since the Lotus Carlton/Omega.

As of July 2020, only 3297 Vauxhall Omegas and 306 Carltons (including some rebadged Rekords) are left on the road in the United Kingdom.
