= Reliant Rebel =

Small four-wheel car produced by Reliant (1964–1974)

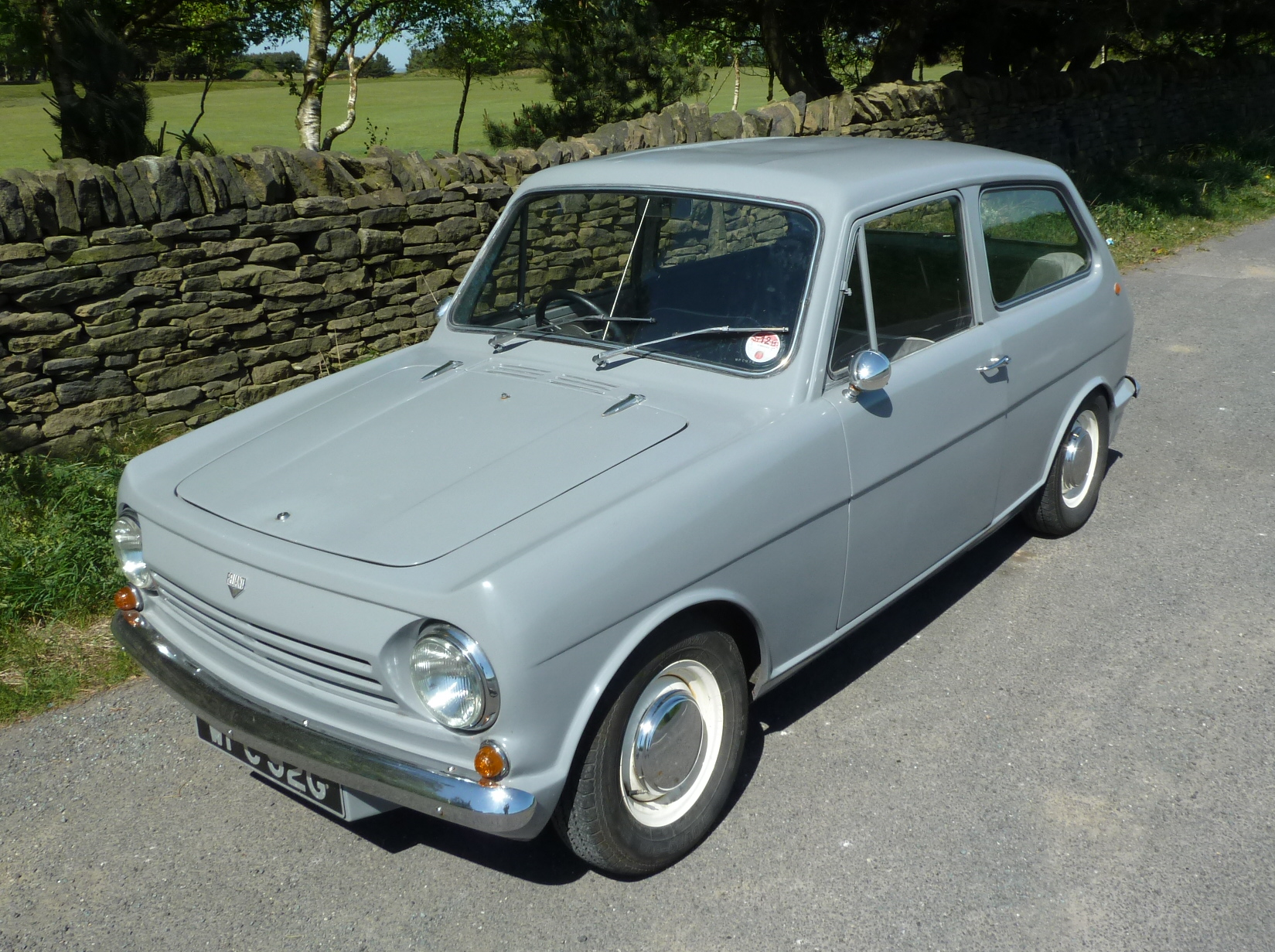
- Rebel registered January 1969

Overview
- Manufacturer: Reliant
- Production: 1964–1974; 2,600 made
- Assembly: United Kingdom: Tamworth, England

Body and chassis
- Body style: 2-door saloon 2-door estate van
- Related: Reliant Regal

Powertrain
- Engine: 598 cc/700 cc/748 cc Straight-4
- Transmission: 4 speed manual

Dimensions
- Wheelbase: 89 in (2,261 mm)
- Length: 138 in (3,505 mm)
- Width: 58 in (1,473 mm)
- Height: 55.5 in (1,410 mm)
- Kerb weight: 538.8–-603.3 kg

Chronology
- Successor: Reliant Kitten

The Reliant Rebel is a small four-wheeled economy car that was produced by Reliant between the year 1964 and 1974. It was designed by Reliant to be a market test to push Reliant into other parts of the market instead of just 3-wheelers.

It was marketed as the smart alternative, because it had a rust-free glass-fibre body, a robust chassis and frugal fuel economy. Many models were produced from 600cc, 700cc, and 750cc with saloon, estate and van variants. It was considered a niche rival to the Austin Mini and Hillman Imp.

== Development ==
The Rebel was the brainchild of Reliant Managing Director Ray Wiggin and was developed after the death of T.L. Williams, the founder of Reliant.

Wiggin believed in the future people would be driving small four-wheeled cars in a new car segment as the Austin Mini launch had been so successful and the UK microcar/three-wheeler segment would die off, such as Reliant's Regal, so Reliant engineers, after working on the development of the four-wheeled Sabra Carmel with Autocars of Haifa, Israel decided to modify the then-current Regal 3/25 to create a four-wheel vehicle.

They built a rolling chassis using a cut and welded Regal 3/25 chassis and drove it around the Two Gates factory to see if it would work. It was however felt that Reliant's 598cc engine wouldn't pull the weight of a finished car; consequently, Reliant engineers wanted to keep the 600 engine but tuned it by skimmed the cylinder head and fitted larger valves to give better torque to cope with the car's extra weight.

The Rebel would get its front suspension from the Triumph Herald, brakes from the Triumph Courier van and the steering box from the Standard 10.

Reliant asked Ogle Design to design the Rebel, with the idea that it should look completely different from the Regal, but should save production costs by retaining some of the Regal's parts such as its doors, windscreen and dashboard. The resulting car was 138 ins.(3505 mm) in length, 58 ins. (1473 mm) in width, with a wheelbase of 89 ins. (2261 mm). The kerb weight of the Rebel depending on the model was between 1185 lbs. and 1327 lbs. (539 kg to 603 kg). The Rebel made its public debut at the Earls Court Motor Show in 1964. The show cars were pre-production models, built in Turkey and driven to Earls Court to test their durability.

Lots of media attention was given to the Rebel at launch at the Earls Court Motor Show with many publications praising the new Reliant small 4 wheeler, Reliant had over 1000 notices of interest from the public at the show from people interested in purchasing the new car.

Reliant could not fill these early orders. Rebel production was low, as Reliant hadn't expanded its factory to give the Rebel its own production line. Reliant instead spent the money making a new production line and factory building for the new Scimitar Coupe, which was launched alongside the Rebel in 1964. For every Rebel produced, Reliant had to shut down Regal production for the Rebel to be produced on that line, something management didn't want to do since the Regal was very in demand and more profitable. This was why there was a big marketing push when the Rebel was launched with very few cars being produced thereafter.

The Rebel didn't get its own dedicated production line until 1971 during Rebel 700 production. It then lost it in 1974 along with the Bond Bug in order to increase production of the newly launched Reliant Robin to keep up with demand after its 1973 launch.

Not having Rebels readily available at dealers after its launch and for several years thereafter, are the main reasons why production numbers were so low compared to the Regal 3/25 and 3/30 which sold over 100/000 cars over same period. Ray Wiggins had developed the Rebel as a marketing exercise for Reliant to push the company into new parts of market. He wanted people to become aware that Reliant was in this segment of the market, but he did not push the Rebel to sell in huge numbers as expected. Management were more concerned about 3-wheeler production rather than Ray Wiggin's longer-term view.

== Models ==
The Rebel launched in October 1964 as a saloon with the same 598cc engine as used in the Reliant Regal 3/25 and only one trim level, but with an accessory list. These vehicles were only produced in two production batches in the Tamworth factory in November/December totaling in only around 100 original Rebel built. These vehicles are mostly seen as pre-production as they were built for dealer demonstrations only and the specification changed between each vehicle as the factory tested different fabrics and materials for the interior. The main differences in these early models were the interior which used the dashboard and steering wheel from the regal 3/25, bonnet hinges hidden in the body work, the spare wheel that was fitted under the bonnet and the interior having minimal carpeting and black gel coat.

Rebel prototypes had a larger front grille, after testing it was found to make the cars run too cool so on early cars the grille was not cut out of the molding leaving a "dummy grille" as some people call it.

== 600 ==
Only 6 months after the Rebel's launch in 1965, it was relaunched as the Rebel Deluxe (but never actually using this name again). The car was updated with a new dashboard design using different instruments, thicker seats for greater comfort and five leaf springs in the rear instead of seven for a softer ride. The top half of the grille was deleted completely and filled in smooth, orange front indicators replaced the original clear units and a unique steering wheel was added. This model in later years was simply named the Rebel 600.

== 700 ==
The Rebel 700, introduced in October 1967, had several major changes from the 600, including a full chassis redesign using stronger steel and construction, a new engine of 701cc, a move to negative earth and many other specification changes. At the Earl's Court Motor Show the estate model was shown for the first time and also announced it was on sale now. The estate used longer rear windows and a large side hinged rear door. Combined with the new fold-flat rear seat this made the Rebel estate incredibly practical, and within two years it was the best-selling model. Later, side windows that slid open could be ordered. In 1971, a van version of the Rebel was introduced after many Rebel estate buyers' enquiries. The van model was basically the estate but without windows. Rear seats could still be ordered in the van with a rear window DIY kit offered by Reliant dealers - thus meaning you could buy a Rebel van make it into an estate avoiding a large amount of tax. Both the estate and the van offered 46 cu. ft. of load space, which increased in the van to 60 cu. ft. without the optional front passenger seat. Not many Rebel 700 Vans were produced as production was in development for the 750, many more 750 vans were produced.

== 750 ==
The next evolution of the Rebel was the 750 model, introduced in October 1972. This car gained some parts with the three-wheeled Reliant Robin that was due to be introduced in 1973, parts gained were:

The new 748cc engine
Rear light clusters
Modified version of the 4 speed all sycro gearbox
Radiator

The Rebel 750 was the most popular Rebel as Reliant gave the Rebel a big marketing push in magazines and newspapers including full-page colour ads, because of this many people were only discovering the Rebel for the first time now with its large range of models. The interior also had a large change, fatter more comfortable front seats were used with a soft touch padded dashboard, all the interiors now used black vinyl seats and black carpets. Van production saw a short-lived effort to produce more as Royal Mail needed a replacement for its fleet of Morris vans, they had already trialed the Reliant Supervan but thought the more conventional Rebel van would be a good replacement, only as little as 10 vans were trialed. In early 1974 with the new Reliant Robin proving to be so popular production on all other models including the Rebel, Bond Bug, Reliant TW9 ended so more Robin models could be made. In 1975 the Rebel would be replaced with the Reliant Kitten.

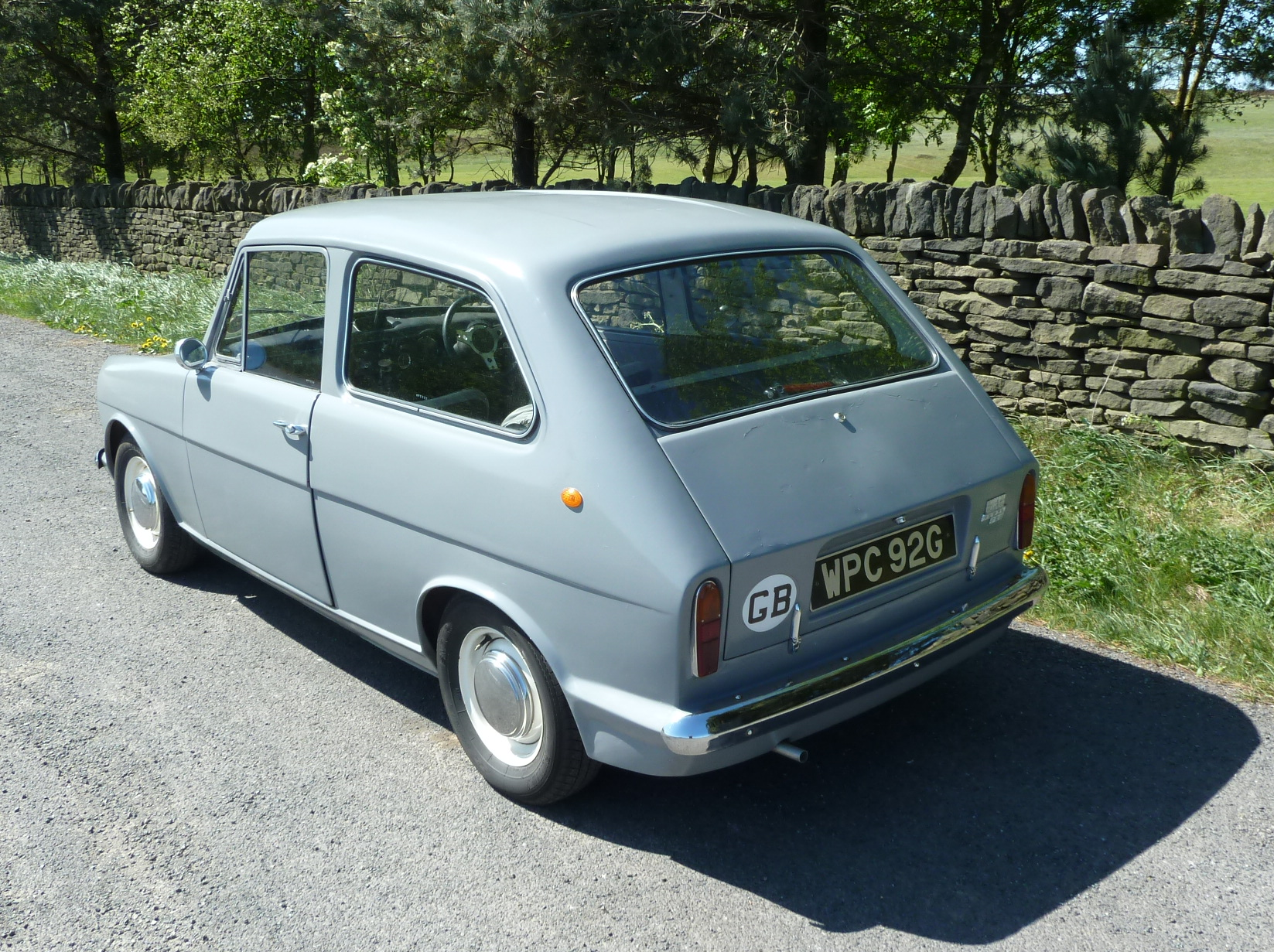
Reliant Rebel saloon

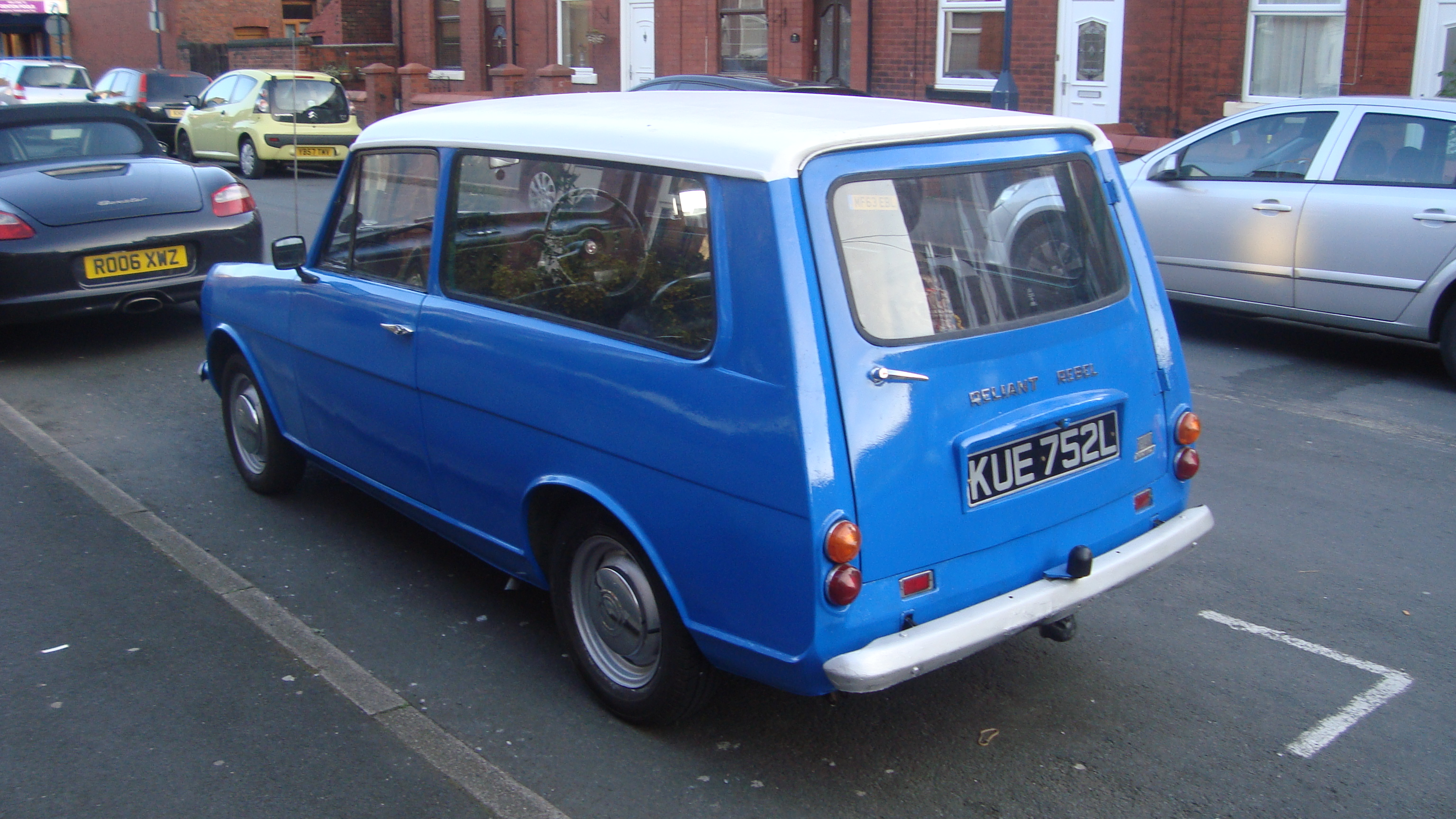
Reliant Rebel estate

== Estate legacy ==
The Reliant Rebel estate was the first time Reliant would build a small estate vehicle using a large side hinged door with fold-flat rear seats. Owing to the popularity of this design, Reliant would carry on using this formula for the Regal, Robin and Rialto models until 1998.

== Engines ==
The Rebel used all of Reliant's own all aluminium OHV engines (based on a reverse-engineered 803cc Standard SC engine used in the discontinued Standard Eight).

The car was launched with a 598cc engine producing 28 horsepower, this was 4 more horsepower than standard 600cc from the Regal 3/25, this was done as the car felt sluggish with its extra weight.

After the introduction of the 70 mph speed limit on British motorways the new speed limit was seen as a target, any vehicle with a top speed lower than 70 mph was seen to be slow, with this Reliant increased the engine size to 701cc and 31 hp, the new engine was then used in both the Rebel and the Regal. The latter model was then named the Rebel 700 in time for the October 1967 London Motor Show. The larger engine gave the Rebel a top speed of 70 mph and would later be fitted into the Regal three-wheeler becoming the regal 3/30.

By 1972 Reliant fitted the 750cc engine to the Rebel, this was to test the new engine before the launch of the new Reliant Robin the next year, the same was done with the Bond Bug 750. At the 1972 Motor Show Reliant launched the Reliant 750, with 35 hp it gave the Rebel 750 a top speed of 80 mph but also gave better MPG of up to 65 to the gallon.

Rebel engines were always of higher compression and higher horsepower because of the car's additional weight compared to the three-wheeled variants. Reliant always introduced a new engine size in the Rebel first, before the Regal or the related Bond Bug received it. All Rebel engine numbers end with a capital R to signify it is a Rebel engine with its modifications.

== Chassis, suspension and steering ==
The chassis from its center back is similar to that of the three-wheeled Regal, but the Rebel features a conventional four-wheel configuration with the front chassis section containing conventional steering and suspension. In the Rebel's case, this is the steering box from a Standard Ten with wishbones, trunnions and ball-joints from the Triumph GT6 / Vitesse and Triumph Herald models. The Rebel's standard 12-in. steel wheels have a PCD of 4 x 4 in. (4 x 101.6mm) and the car rides on 5.50 X 12 in. tyres. The leaf springs on the rebel are not Regal as many people believe as the rebel leaf springs are longer.

== Gearbox ==
The Rebel was introduced with a four-speed gearbox which features synchromesh on the top three ratios. There is no synchro on first gear. The gearbox was based on that of the Regal, but had an extended tailshaft with a linkage for the gearstick.

By 1972 synchromesh had been extended to all four forward speeds as the gearbox was now based on the Robin gearbox. The gearstick was no longer on a linkage but "projects forward from the front of the transmission tunnel". "The light-weight body material and the aluminium engine block meant that the car was some 15% lighter than the (slightly shorter) Mini and 35% lighter than the early Renault 5", which was also introduced in 1972.

== Production numbers ==
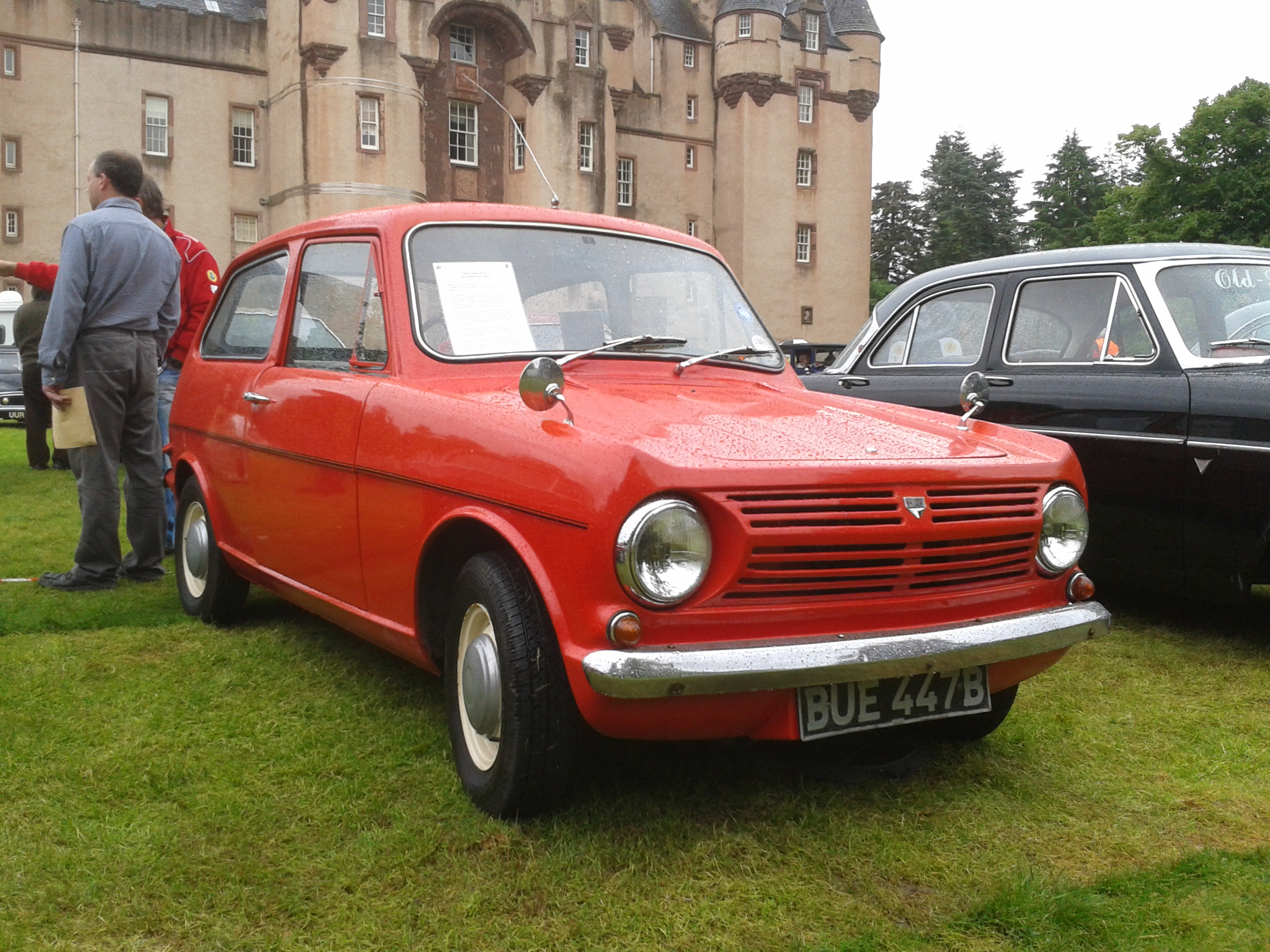
first registered September 1964

A total of 2,600 Rebels were made in saloon, estate and van variants. Most were sold in the UK but many were sold in the Caribbean islands. Of the approximately 900 Rebels which were exported, a number of them were in left-hand drive form to suit some of their export market.

As above most of the reasoning behind the low production numbers was Reliant didn't give the Rebel its own production line until 1971, before this if a batch of Rebels needed to be produced then Reliant had to stop production of its popular Regal 3/25, something which Reliant didn't want to do very often.

== Rebel 1600 GT prototype ==
During the Rebel's production run, Reliant was experimenting with a more sporting variant to complement the Scimitar GT and forthcoming Scimitar GTE. Whereas the existing Rebel was powered by 598-748cc engines with 25-35 hp, the Rebel 1600 GT prototype codenamed FW6 had been fitted with the 80 hp and 92 ft-lb (Net) / 91 hp and 102 ft-lb (SAE) 1599cc Ford Crossflow engine from the mk2 Ford Cortina 1600E. Reliant had a relationship with Ford using their engines in Reliant sports cars with Reliant building Ford's fibreglass truck cabs in return. The Rebel 1600 GT was a working road legal prototype and had it been given the go-ahead would have been launched in around 1968, but was never put into production as Reliant Management found out the Rebel 1600 GT could not only out perform the bigger Scimitar models (around the factory as Engineers had been racing them), but also reputedly featured a power-to-weight ratio of 204 bhp per ton which would have exceeded that of many modern sportscars.
