= Liege (disambiguation) =

Liège is a city in Belgium.

Liège or Liege may also refer to:

- Liege, a feudal relationship between lord and vassal; see Homage (feudal)

== Other places ==
=== Places within Belgium ===
- Liège (province), a province of Belgium
  - Arrondissement of Liège, an administrative and judicial subdivision
  - Roman Catholic Diocese of Liège, a Roman Catholic Diocese coextensive with the province
- Prince-Bishopric of Liège, a former state of the Holy Roman Empire in the Low Countries
- Republic of Liège, a short-lived, unrecognized state (1789–1791) centered on Liège, Belgium

=== Outside of Belgium ===
- Le Liège, a commune in central France
- Liège Island, in the Antarctic

== Transportation ==
- Liège (car), automobile inspired by the 1950s classic sporting car era
- Liège Airport, the airport of the city of Liège
- Liège station (Paris Metro), a subway station in Paris

== Military ==
- Battle of Liège, the first battle of World War I
- Liège Medal, an unofficial World War I campaign medal issued by the Belgian city of Liège

== Other uses ==
- RFC Liège, a Belgian football club
- University of Liège, a major public university

== People ==
- Stephen of Liège (c. 850–920), bishop, writer and musician
- Alger of Liège (1055–1131), clergyman and writer
- Jacques de Liège (died after 1330), or Iacobus de Ispania, musician
- Jean de Liège (c. 1330–1381), sculptor
- Liege Hulett (1838–1928) South African sugar magnate and philanthropist

== See also ==
- Liege lord (disambiguation)
- Liégeois, an eastern form of the Walloon language
