= Reliant Regal =

Three-wheeled automobile

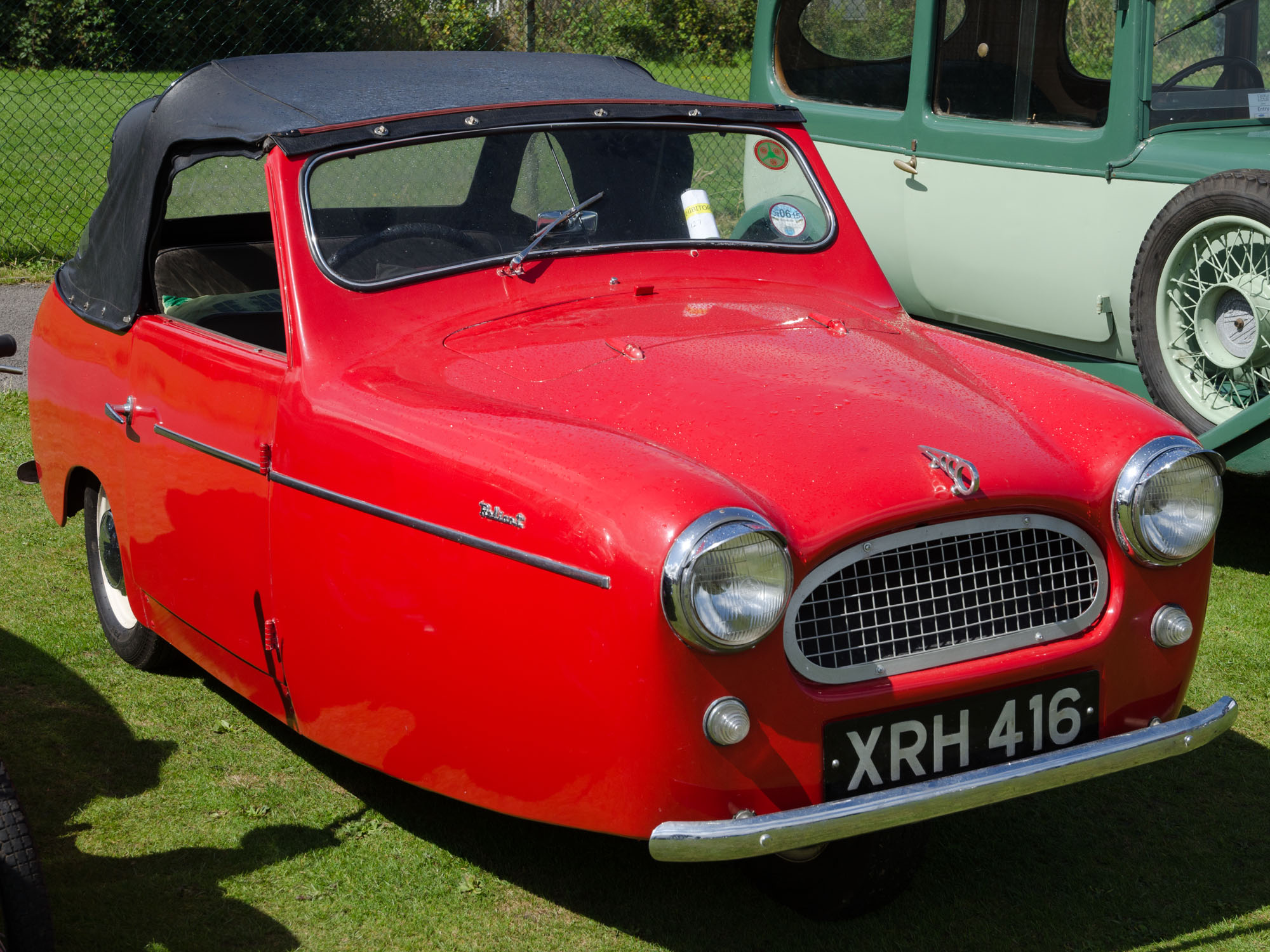
- 1956 Reliant Regal (Mk III)

Overview
- Manufacturer: Reliant
- Production: 1952–1973
- Assembly: United Kingdom: Tamworth

Body and chassis
- Class: City car (A)
- Layout: Front-engine, rear-wheel-drive

Dimensions
- Wheelbase: 1,931 mm (76.0 in)
- Length: 3,429 mm (135.0 in)
- Width: 1,486 mm (58.5 in)
- Height: 1,448 mm (57.0 in)
- Kerb weight: 445 kg (981 lb)

Chronology
- Predecessor: Reliant Regent
- Successor: Reliant Robin

The Reliant Regal is a small three-wheeled car and van that was manufactured from 1952 to 1973 by the Reliant Motor Company in Tamworth, England, replacing the earlier Reliant Regent three-wheeled cyclecar van which had its origins in a design bought by Reliant from the Raleigh Bicycle Company. As a three-wheeled vehicle having a lightweight (under 7 cwt, 355.6 kg) construction, under UK law it is considered a "tricycle" and can be driven on a full (class A) motorcycle licence. In 1962, with the release of the Reliant Regal 3/25, van and estate versions with a side-hinged rear door were marketed as the Reliant Supervan.

== History ==
Following the launch of the Mk I in 1953, the Regal passed through many revisions in a short period, with the "first generation" using the original wooden frame and discrete-panel bodywork design through to the 1961 Mk VI. The Mk II was introduced in 1954 with a mostly similar design to the Mk1, though it can be distinguished by an updated windshield. The Mk III was introduced in 1956 with a heavily updated design and featured an all-fibreglass body for the first time. This was followed by the Mk IV in 1958, the Mk V in 1959 and the Mk VI in 1960.

In 1962, Reliant introduced the Mk VII, code named "TW7" (Three Wheeler 7). This version featured a new OHV Reliant engine (based on a reverse-engineered all-alloy version of the 803cc Standard SC engine used in the discontinued Standard Eight), a new steel chassis and bonded shell design for the body, fully updated visual styling, and was badged based on their number of wheels/bhp. The Regal 3/25, was sold from 1962 to 1968, with a 600cc engine produced 25 bhp (actually 598cc/24 bhp). In 1969, the Regal 3/30 was introduced with a 700cc engine that produced 30 bhp (actually 701cc / 29 bhp). The Regal 21E and Regal 21E 700 were also sold. The 21E version was fitted with 21 extras, which were otherwise available as optional extras to the standard car. These extras included a spot light, a fog light, chrome plated bumper over-riders, sun visors, an oil gauge, outer wheel trims and metallic paint. In 1973, the Regal was replaced by the Reliant Robin (code named "TW8").

Regals MkI–MkII had aluminium bodies and 747-cc side-valve engines. However, during the 1950s, the price of aluminium increased markedly across Europe. In response, Reliant developed an expertise in making panels of glass fibre which piece by piece replaced the aluminium panels, until the 1956 Mark 3 Regal featured a wholly glass fibre body. Unlike Panhard, who responded to the increased cost of aluminium by substituting heavier steel panels, Reliant's choice of the glass fibre technology ensured that the Regal was able to retain its advantageous light weight, with the resulting ability to use smaller, lower powered and therefore cheaper and more economical engines. The Regal Mk VI was the last Regal to be powered by a side-valve engine, as by 1962 Reliant had developed their own all aluminium 600 cc OHV engine that was fitted into the new Regal 3/25.

The Regal 3/25 (TW7) version was introduced in October 1962 and was available as a saloon, van, estate and pickup. The estate version was essentially a van (and badged as a Supervan) but with rear side windows and fold down, removable rear seats. Unlike previous Regals, this no longer had a wooden frame and instead had a unitary construction body of reinforced fibreglass. Fibreglass was moulded in two major units (outer and inner) and then bonded together and bolted to a steel chassis. Meanwhile, on 25 April 1968, a year before BMC celebrated their 2,000,000th Mini, Reliant sales director T.H.Scott personally drove the 50,000th Regal 3/25 off the assembly line at Reliant's Tamworth plant.

A few months later, in August 1968, the 701 cc engine introduced in the Reliant Rebel the previous autumn found its way into the Regal. For the three-wheeler, the compression ratio was lowered to 7.5:1, reducing the power to a claimed 29.5 bhp from the Rebel's 35 bhp. Nevertheless, this still represented a useful increase over the 26 bhp claimed for the 600 cc unit which the 701 replaced.

=== Gallery ===
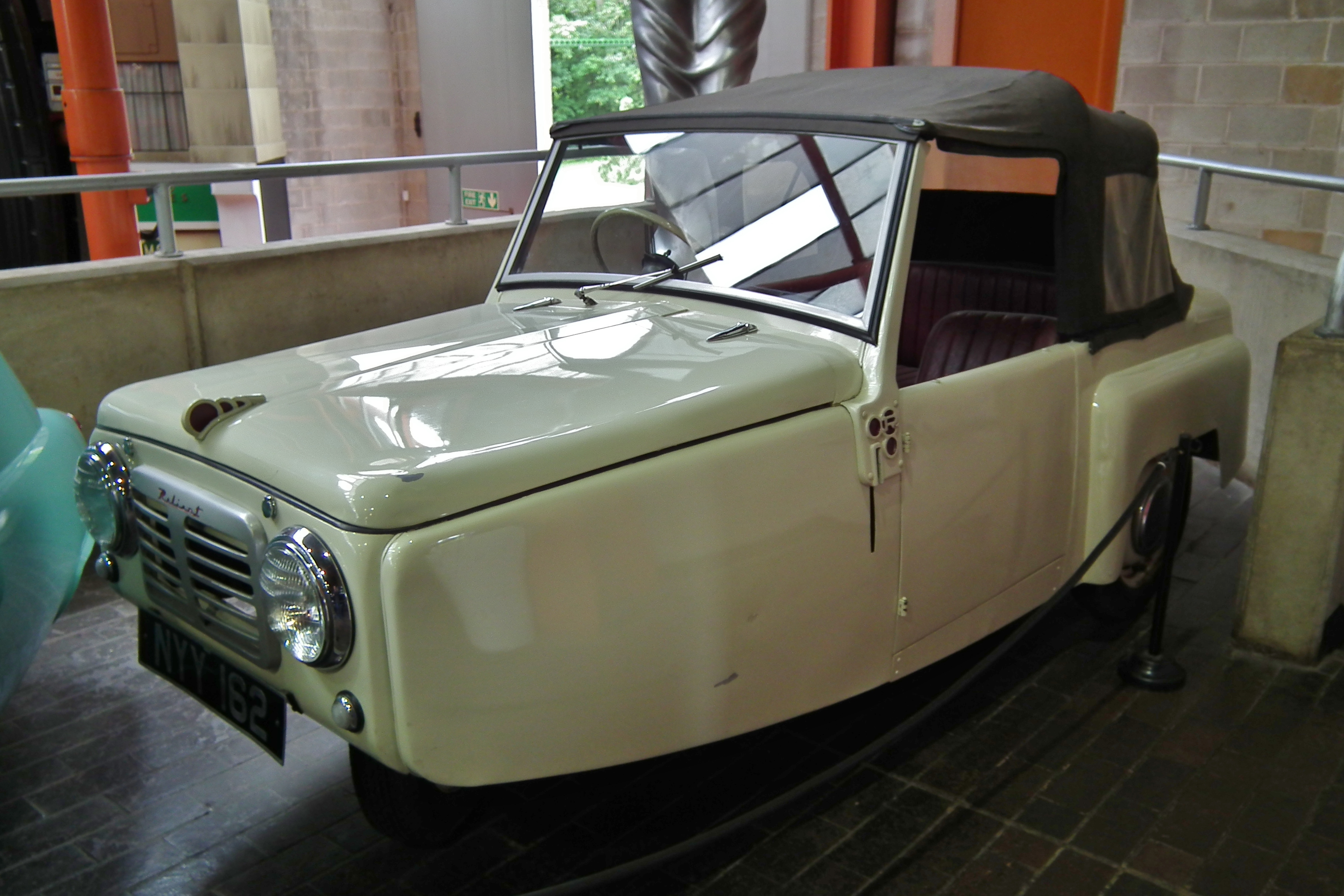
Mk I Convertible (1953)

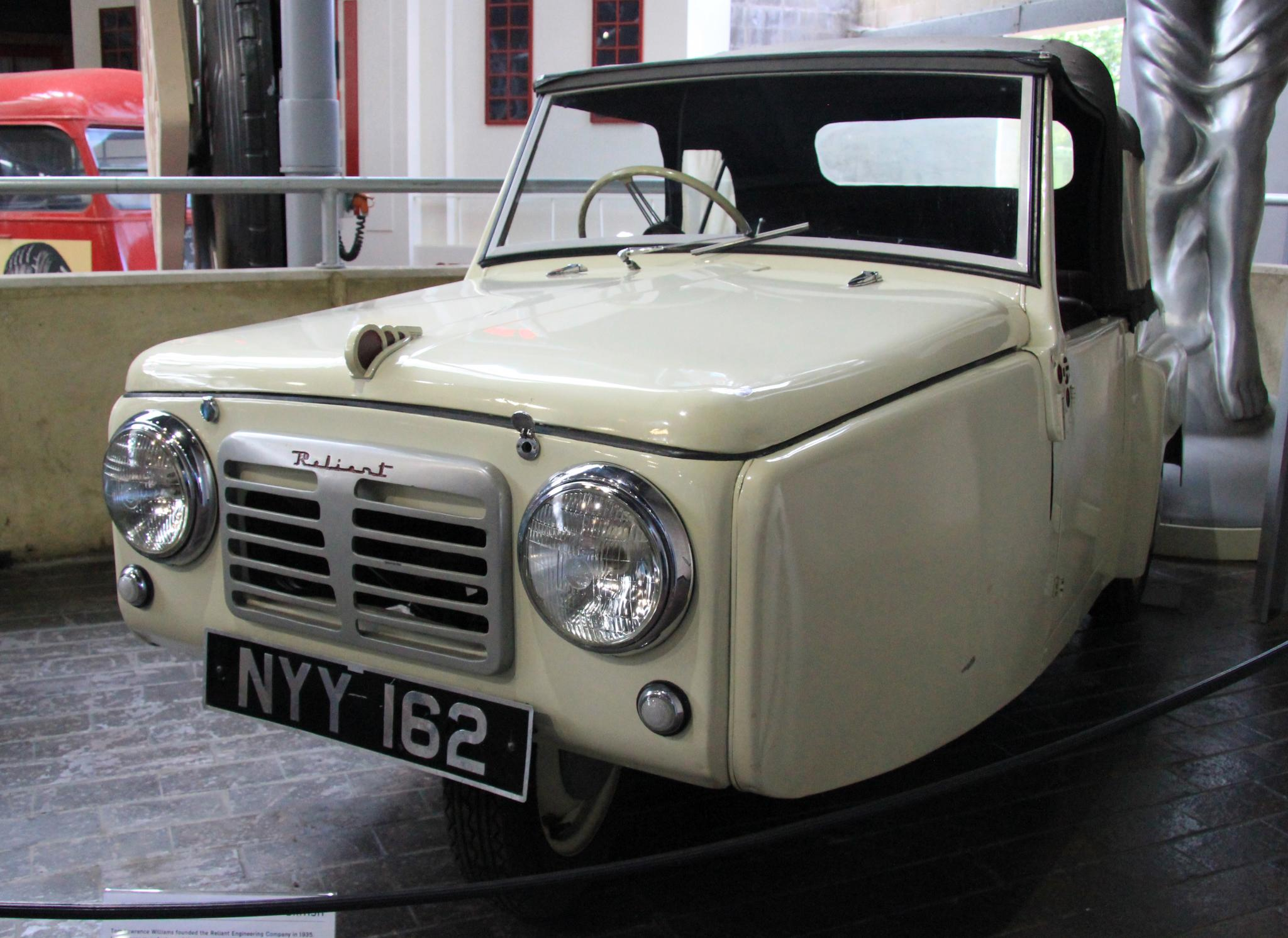
Another view showing front grille and headlight details

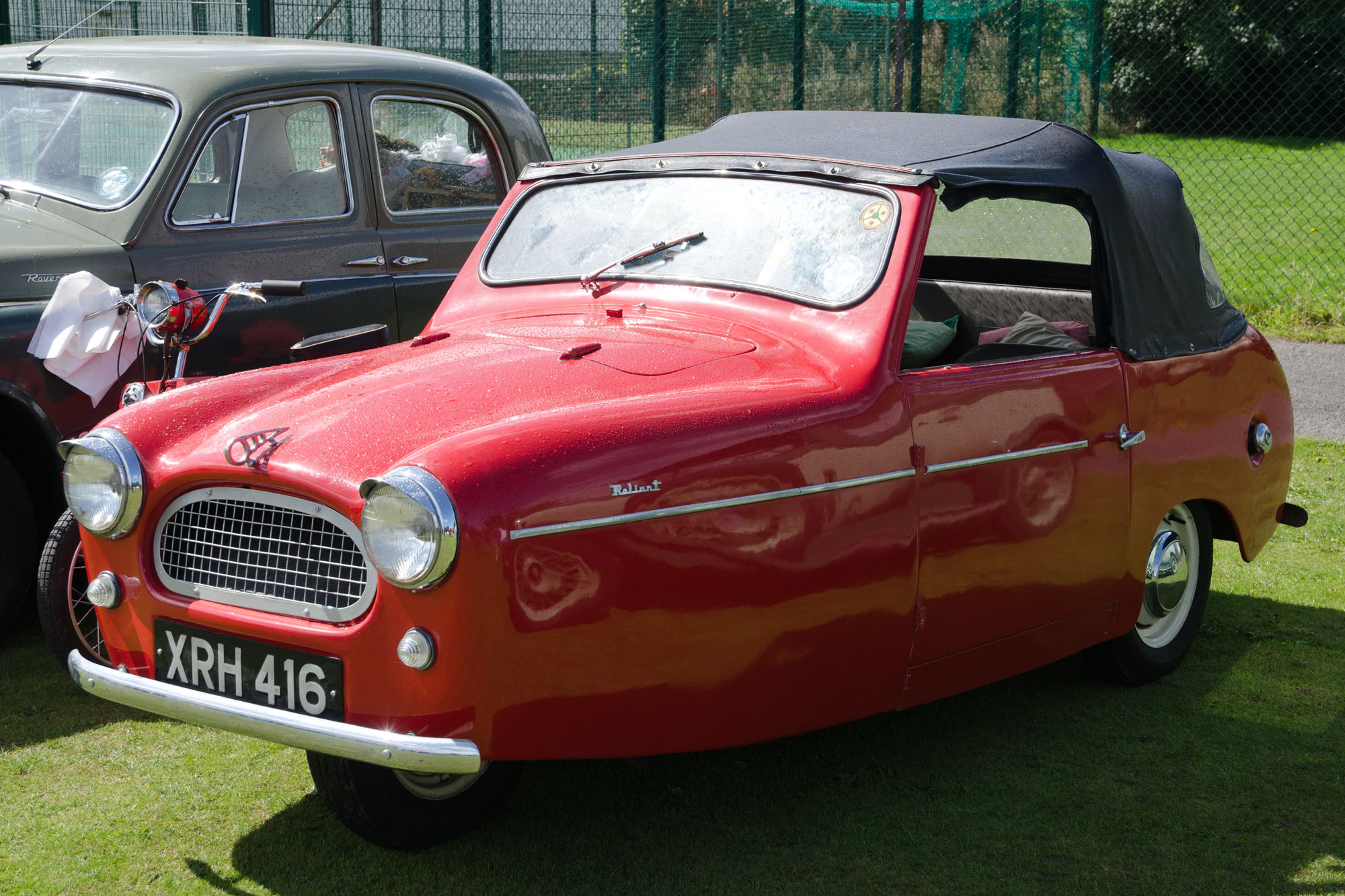
Mk III Convertible (1956)

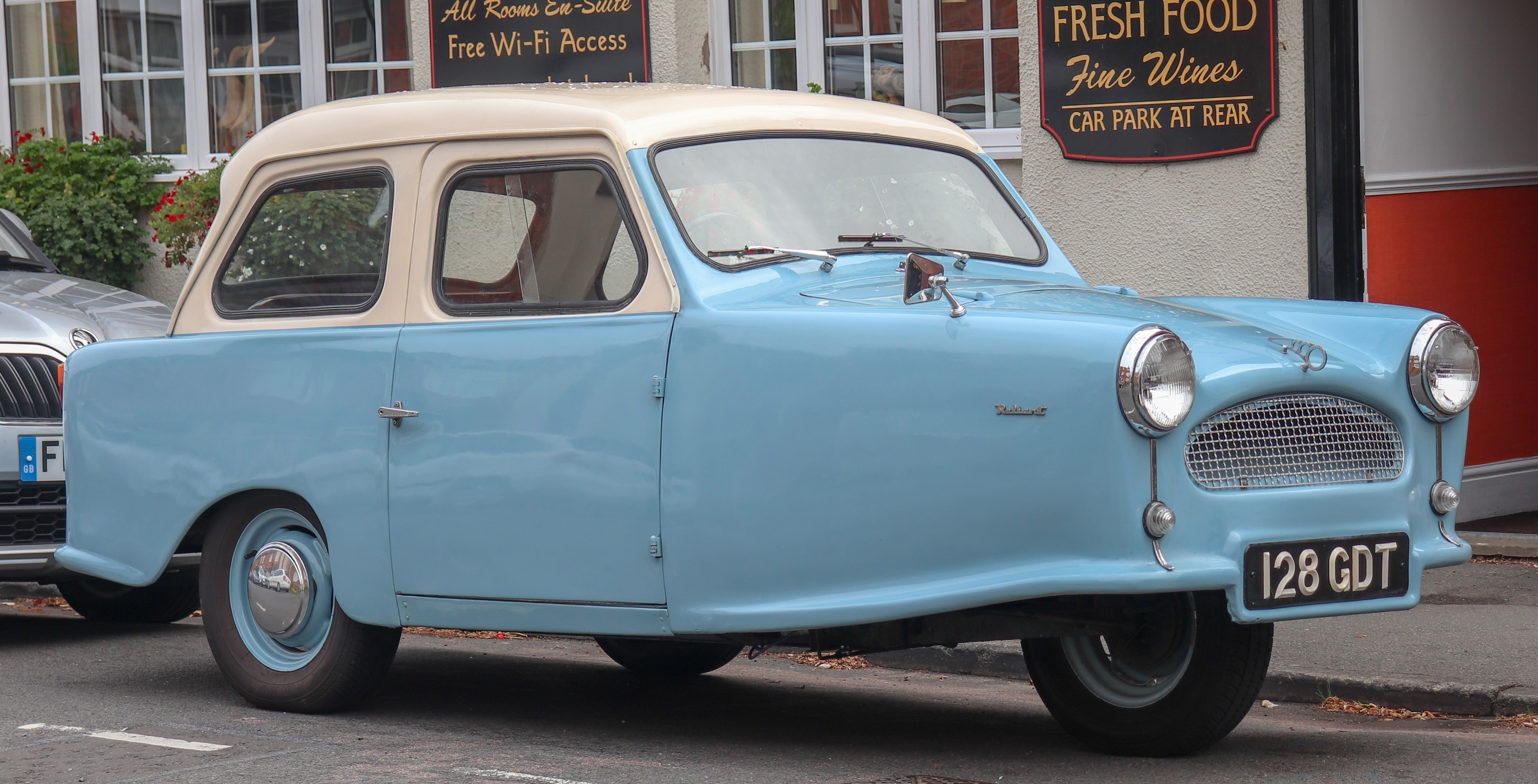
Mk VI (1960–1962)

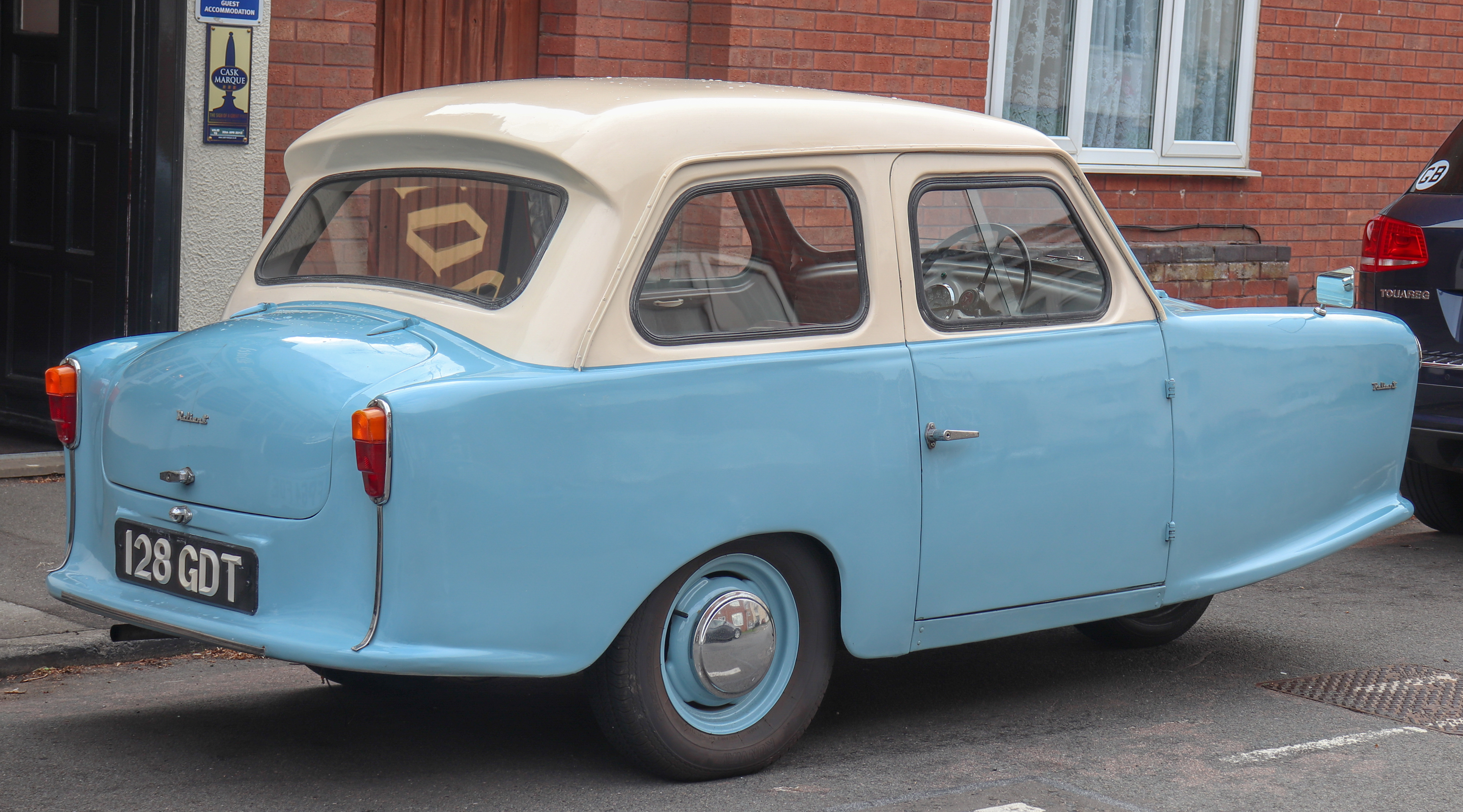
Mk VI (1960–1962) rear view

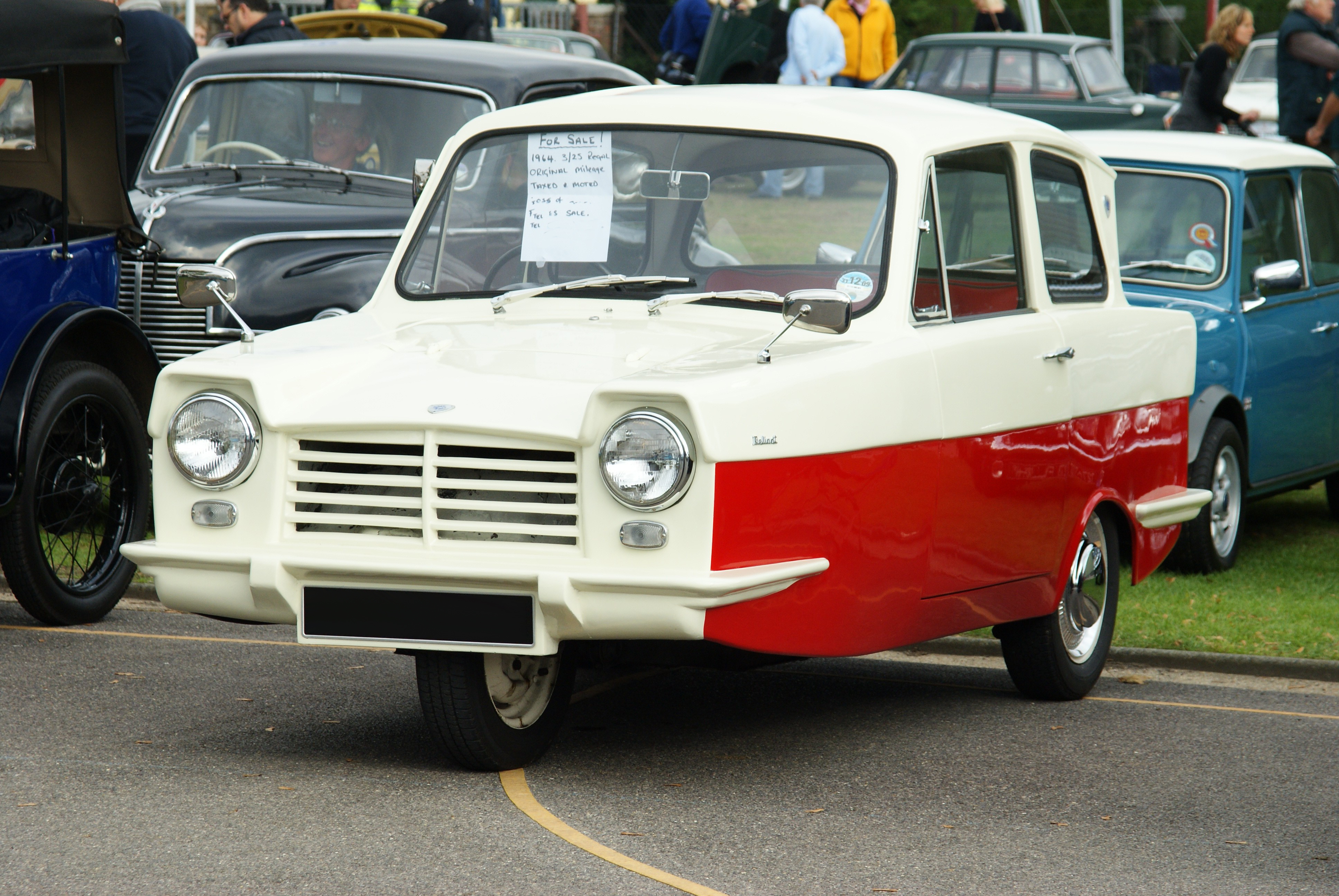
Regal 3/25 (1962–1968)

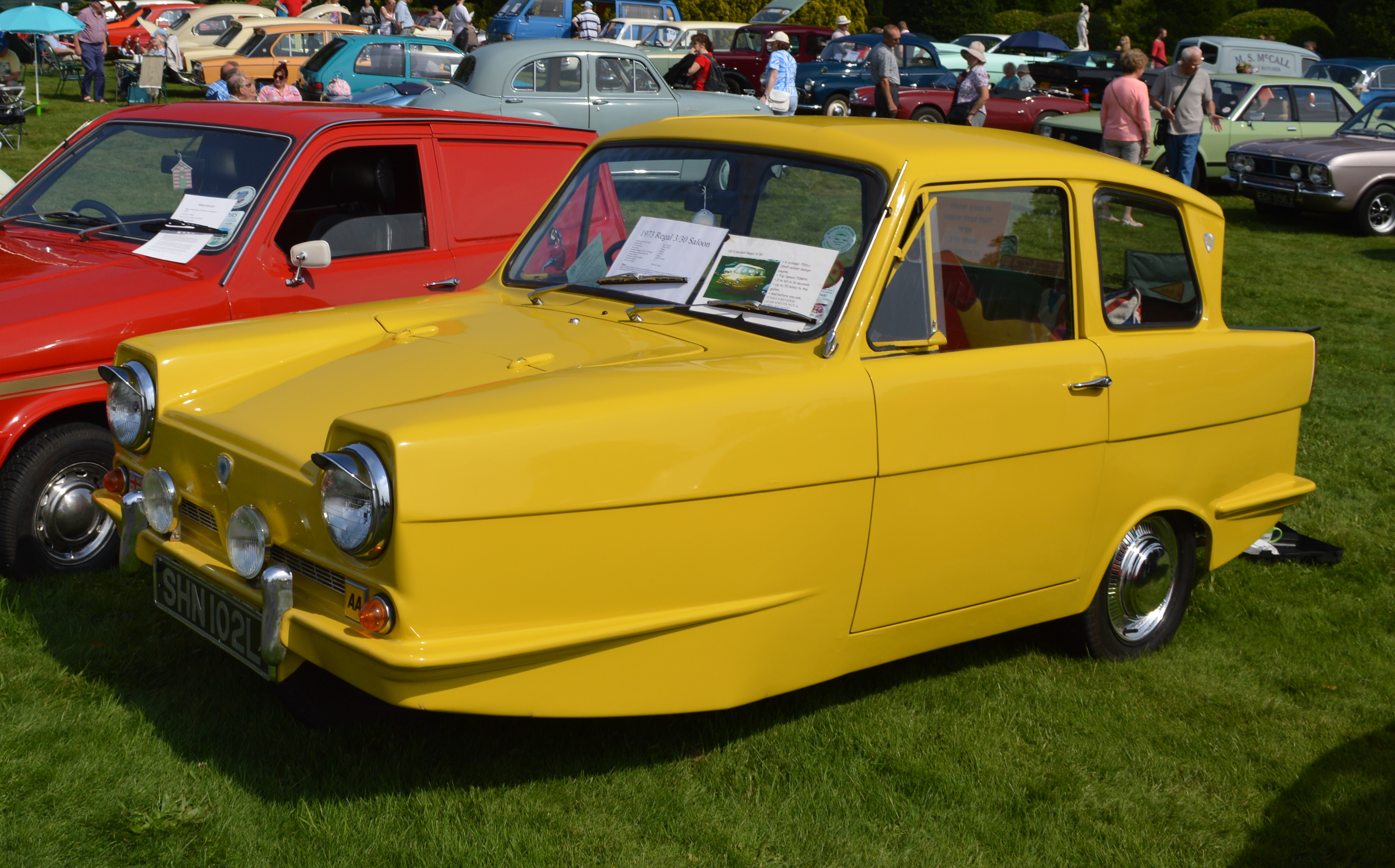
Regal 3/30 (1969)

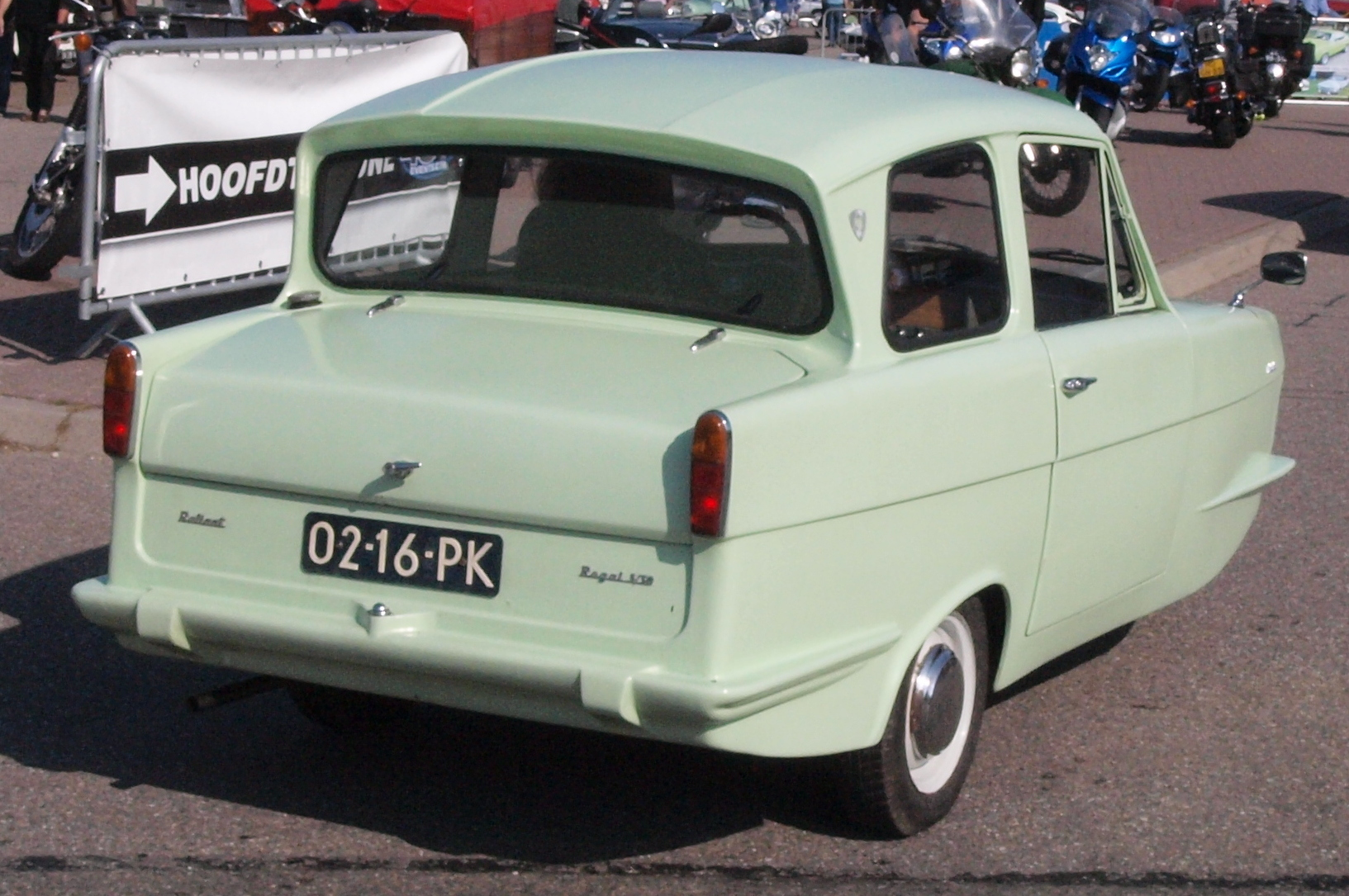
Regal 3/30 rear

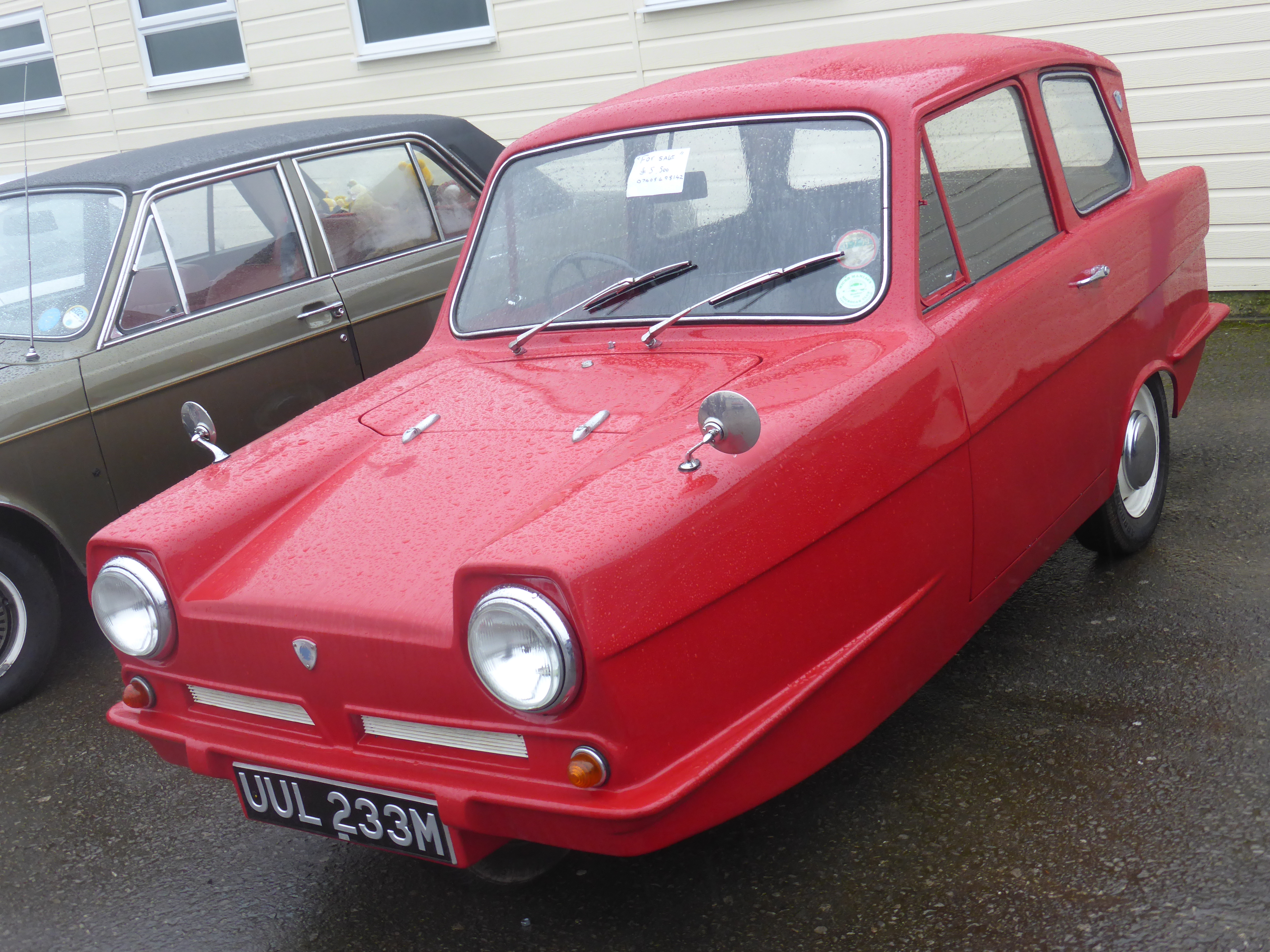
Regal 21E 700 (1973)

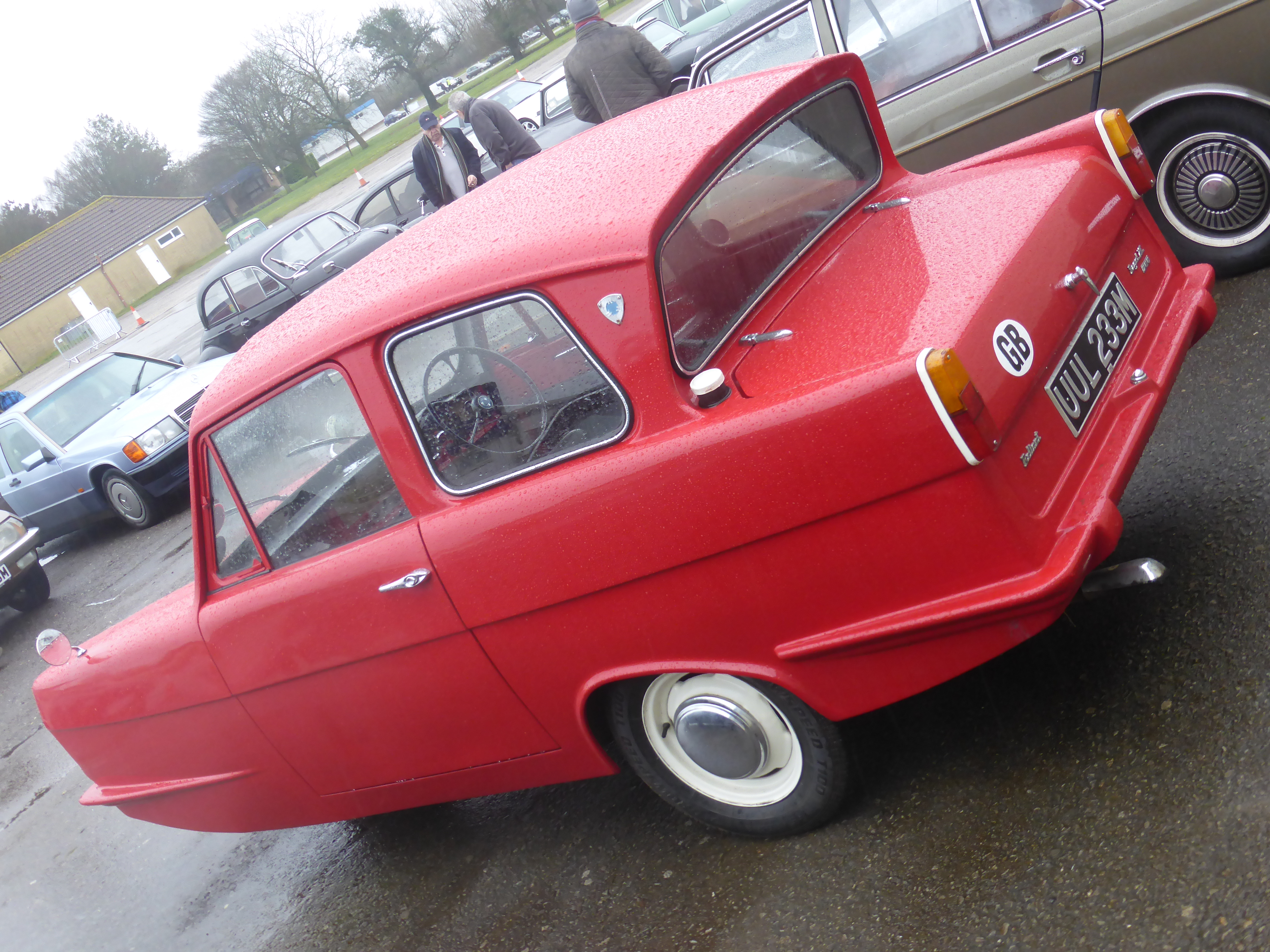
Regal 21E 700 (1973)

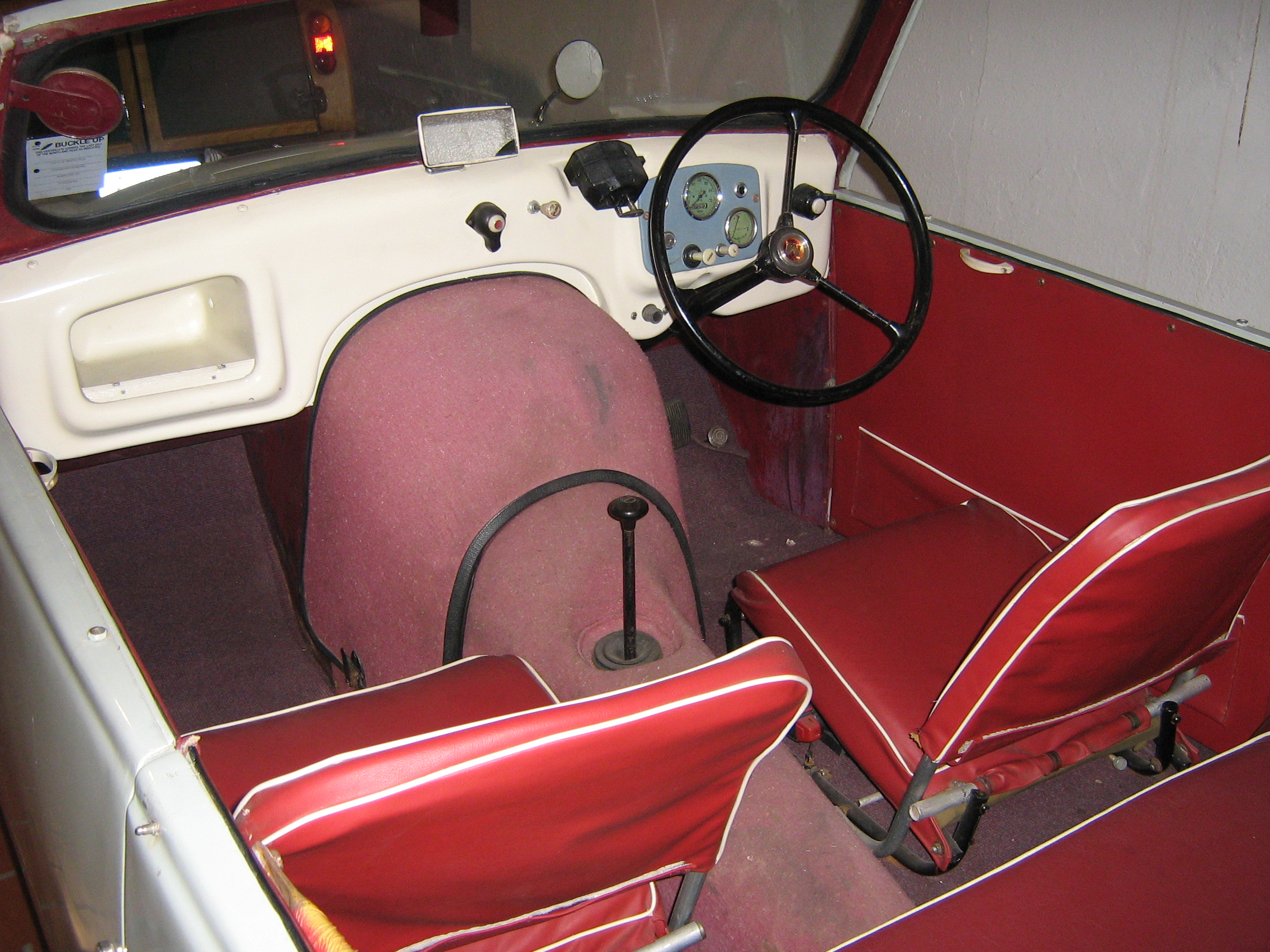
Regal Mk III, interior (1957)

== In popular culture ==
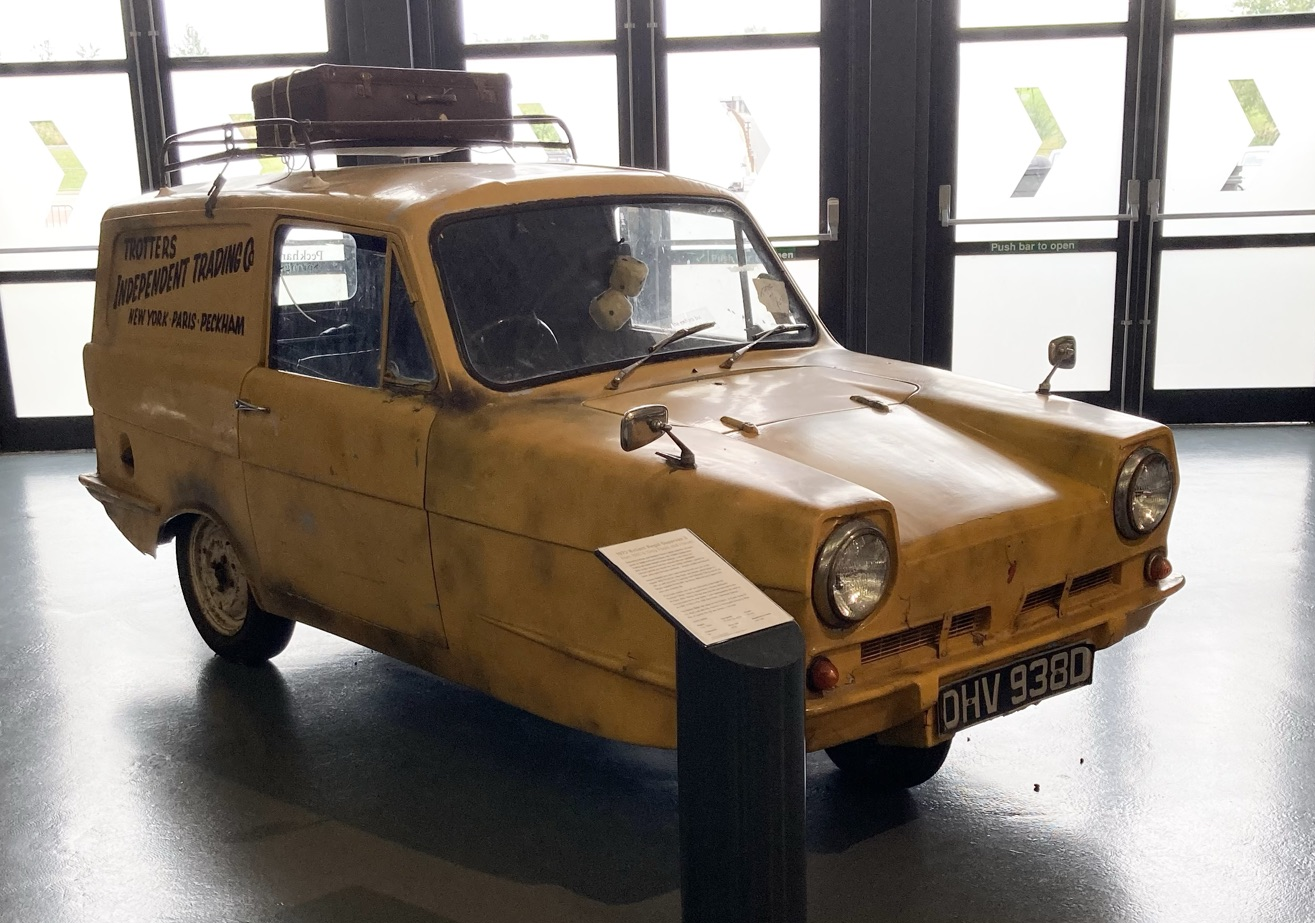
A Reliant Supervan III that was used in Only Fools and Horses, on display at the British Motor Museum

An example of a Supervan III is the iconic yellow van belonging to Del Boy and Rodney Trotter in the long-running BBC sitcom Only Fools and Horses. There were several Reliant Supervans used in filming, and many people claim to own genuine screen used vans, but very few have proof.

According to BBC News, despite the Regal's use in Only Fools and Horses, many instead associate the Reliant Robin with the show.

In another British TV comedy, Mr. Bean, a running gag involves the titular character played by British comedian Rowan Atkinson frequently coming into conflict with a light blue 1972 Reliant Supervan III, which gets tipped over, crashed into, or bumped out of its parking space. This was also continued in Mr. Bean: The Animated Series.

The 2011 Pixar film Cars 2 features a French character named Tomber who is patterned on a Reliant Regal saloon car, with some creative modifications, such as the headlights of a Citroën Ami. His name means "to fall" in French, referring to the reputed instability of three-wheel vehicles.

A Reliant Regal is shown in the closing ceremony of the 2012 London Olympics with it falling apart and Batman and Robin coming out of it, a plot that appeared in an episode of Only Fools and Horses.
