= Reliant Rialto =

Small three-wheel car produced by Reliant (1982–1996)

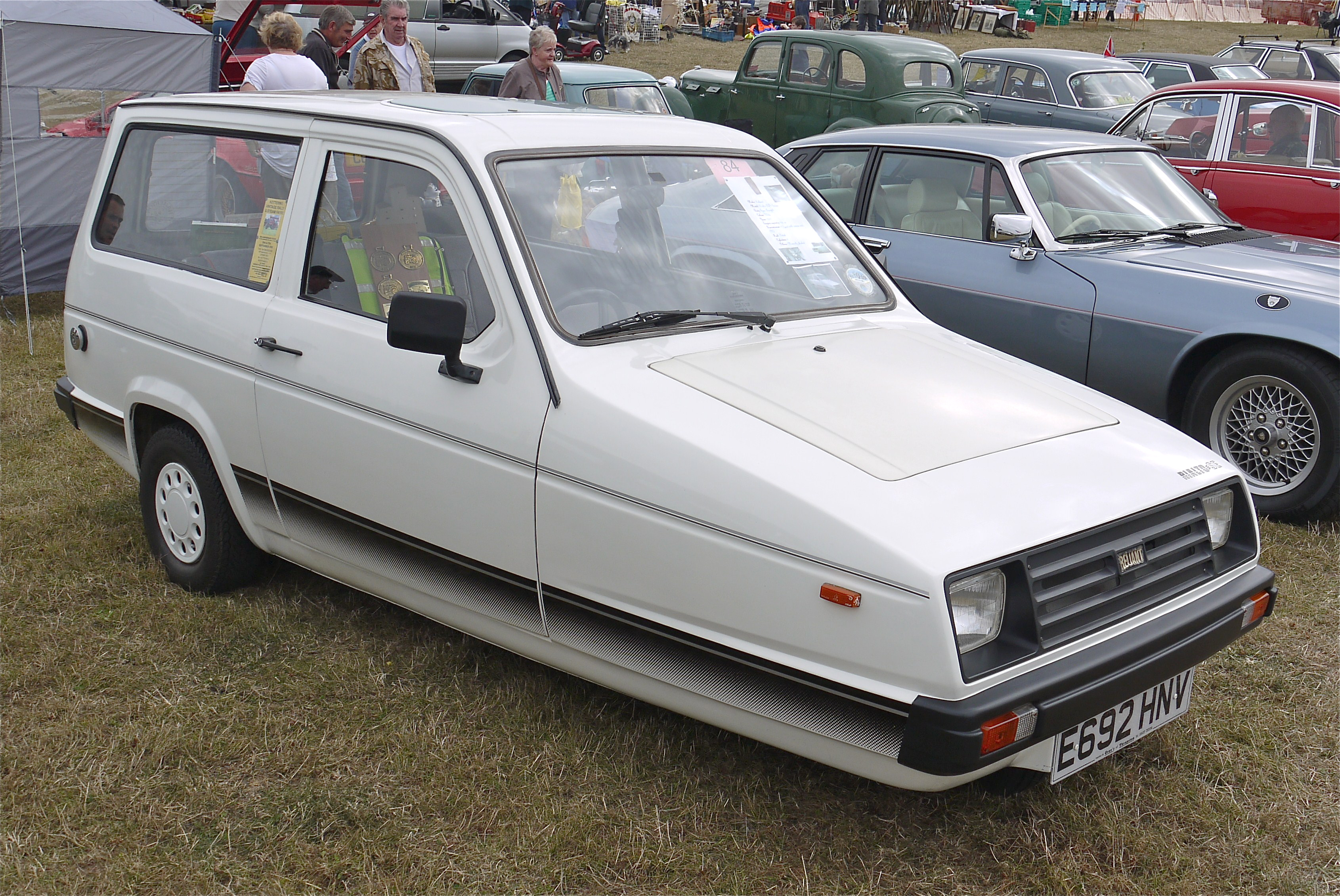
- Reliant Rialto Estate

Overview
- Manufacturer: Reliant
- Production: 1982–1996
- Assembly: United Kingdom: Tamworth, England

Body and chassis
- Class: City car (A)
- Body style: 3-door hatchback; 3-door estate; 2-door saloon
- Layout: FMR layout, with single front wheel

Powertrain
- Engine: 848 cc OHV I4

Chronology
- Predecessor: Reliant Robin Mk. 1
- Successor: Reliant Robin Mk. 2

The Reliant Rialto is a three-wheeled car that was manufactured by Reliant Motor Company, replacing the original Mk 1 Reliant Robin in 1982. It featured a much squarer aerodynamic body, servicing panels, a single large windscreen wiper, a thicker fibreglass body, and altered interior, but the chassis, engine, and a lot of large components were carried over from the previous model. The improvements gave the Rialto improved high-speed stability as well as improved fuel economy.

The Rialto was the first Reliant to be designed by International Automotive Design (IAD UK Ltd), where previous Reliant models were generally conceived by Ogle Design.

The Rialto was built in a number of different configurations, including: a saloon, estate, van, hatchback, pick-up, and flatbed. Rialtos also came in a number of different series: the Mk 1 models from 1982 to 1983; the Rialto 2 series from 1983 to 1986; and the Rialto SE from 1987 until 1995 – the estate model was built in tandem with the Robin Mk 2 estate, which was introduced in 1992. The last Rialto model to be built was the 1997 'Giant' pick up.

Upon release, the Rialto had a 12-month waiting list in 1982, and was one of Reliant's best-selling models ever, but never gained as much praise as the better-known Robin. In the 1980s the Rialto was Reliant's only 3 wheeler model; production of the Mk 1 Robin ended in 1981, and its successor – the Robin Mk 2 – wouldn't materialise until 1989. Even after the introduction of the new Robin, the Rialto estate was available to order until 1996.

== Origins and stumbles ==
The idea of updating the Robin dates back to 1978, but by 1980 sales were slowing, and Reliant thought a simple facelift may have fixed this. Originally the Rialto was nothing more than a nose-end treatment with the same square headlamps and black grille. This was eventually rejected, as it was said the squarer front end didn't look good against the rounder body shape of the Mk 1 Robin.

A design by International Automotive Design was also presented for the Rialto: an entirely new model in the form of a larger 3-wheeled hatchback whose design was not dissimilar to the Mk 3 Ford Escort, even using the same front and rear lights.

In the end Reliant decided to save money by continuing to use the mechanical parts of the Mk 1 Robin, such as its running gear, but update the whole car with a new style of body, and rename it the Rialto.

The Rialto was designed to have a higher compression engine and high geared rear axle for the 1980s "motorway age", but because the company wanted to bring the car to market quickly, it was launched in 1982 using the same engine, gearbox, and axle line up from the original Robin. The mechanical improvements were ready a year later, when the car was relaunched as the Rialto 2.

== Mk 1 Rialto ==
The Mk 1 Rialto series was available in three separate body styles: saloon, estate, and van. The range consisted of basic specification with a vinyl interior, and could be ordered with a list of choice optional extras. GLS specification cars which came with a clock, FM/AM radio, voltage gauge, cloth covered seats with extra matching cloth covered areas on the interior, extra thick carpets with a carpeted boot area, GLS decals, leather steering wheel, a spare wheel, and radial tyres. All cars had a dark green dash with dark grey door cards.

The sole available engine was Reliant's own four-cylinder 850 cc "red top" (so-called because of its red rocker cover) mated to a four-speed gearbox. This engine was carried over from the previous Mk 1 Robin, and produced 40 hp (30 kW), a top speed of 85 mph (137 km/h), and fuel consumption of up to 60 mpg (imp). The most recognisable feature of a Mk 1 Rialto is the thick stripe which runs front to rear, in either gold, graphite, or silver –according to body colour.

== The Rialto 2 ==
The Rialto 2 model was the second version of the Rialto, and was released to the public in late 1983. It featured a number of improvements over its predecessor, including a reworked engine (the 850 engine now had an ultra skimmed head to raise the compression ratio, along with a new camshaft for improved low-end torque), a new needle in the SU carburettor, and a specific distributor. This engine was named the "economy" engine, with each unit featuring a capital 'E' stamped on the cylinder head, and every engine number ending with a capital 'E'. The rocker cover was painted yellow, which gave the engine the nickname "the yellow top".

Reliant had initially wanted to launch the original Rialto with these improvements, but were unable to do so due to time pressures during development. Therefore, the original Mk 1 Rialto was a compromise to build demand using a number of carryover parts from the Robin.

To match the new engine, the rear axle ratio was raised to 2.78/1 (and can be identified with 'B' stamped on the diff case). This, combined with the engine, gave the car a much higher top speed of 100 mph, and a fuel economy figure of 72mpg at 56 mph. The engine now produced peak torque at lower engine speeds, and the axle allowed the Rialto to cruise at 70 mph at lower revs. This created the disadvantage of not being able to cruise at 30 mph in 4th gear.

Rialto 2s now had vinyl seats on basic models, or corduroy cloth seats on GLS models. All Rialto 2 models, regardless of specification, were fitted with a vacuum economy gauge, along with a new decal set of a double coach line with "RIALTO 2" on the wings and rear door, and new wheel trims. Another visual improvement on GLS models took the form of black plastic bumpers which wrapped around the front and rear.

By late 1984, the Rialto 2 was re-released with an altered specification; the rear axle ratio was returned to 3.23/1, as customers complained of being unable to use 4th gear at city speeds, and the economy gauge was no longer fitted.

== Rialto SE ==
The Rialto SE was introduced in 1986. Whilst the best selling model in the Rialto 2 range was the estate, Reliant introduced for the first time a hatchback Rialto, after much development to the roof structure to add enough strength for the tailgate hinges. This model was a huge commercial success, and soon become Reliant's best selling model.

Mechanical parts of the new Rialto SE had reverted to the standard specification engine, but now with a grey rocker cover, and were equipped with a pre-engaged starter motor for improved starting.

Bodywork now came in brighter colours than before, as well as having a black body decals running along the bottom of the car, plus a single orange pin stripe running front to rear in the centre of the car.

The introduction of the Rialto SE hatchback resulted in the Rialto saloon becoming the cheapest car in the whole range, poor sales of the saloon would result it ending production in 1995.

By 1990, a roller bearing clutch was also introduced on all models.

After the launch of the Mk 2 Robin hatchback in 1989 (replacing the Rialto hatchback), many customers asked for an estate model. This appeared in 1992 but wasn't advertised, the Robin estate was simply the Mk 2 Robin nose on a Rialto estate body but was sold as a higher model with better trim levels.

In 1996, after Reliant Motor company came out of receivership all Rialto models ended production immediately, from now on only Mk2 Robin estates would be built. Reliant motor company didn't have type approval for a Mk 2 Robin estate, so all estate models were registered as Rialto, this often confused buyers and still does to this day.

The newly launched Robin estate would now receive a number of updates & improvements: it gained 12-inch wheels, a new braking system, different interior trim, and an updated dashboard design with new dials. Also the estate model gained the same rear lamps as the hatchback to save on costs.

Additionally, a Reliant Rialto pickup named 'Giant' was built which was introduced as a production model in 1997, but only for a limited time on a small production run.

The 'Giant' Rialto was the last true Rialto model to be built in 1997 with its original nose end design.

The Rialto name would finally die in 1998 when Reliant motors started to register Robin estate models correctly.

Reliant Rialto
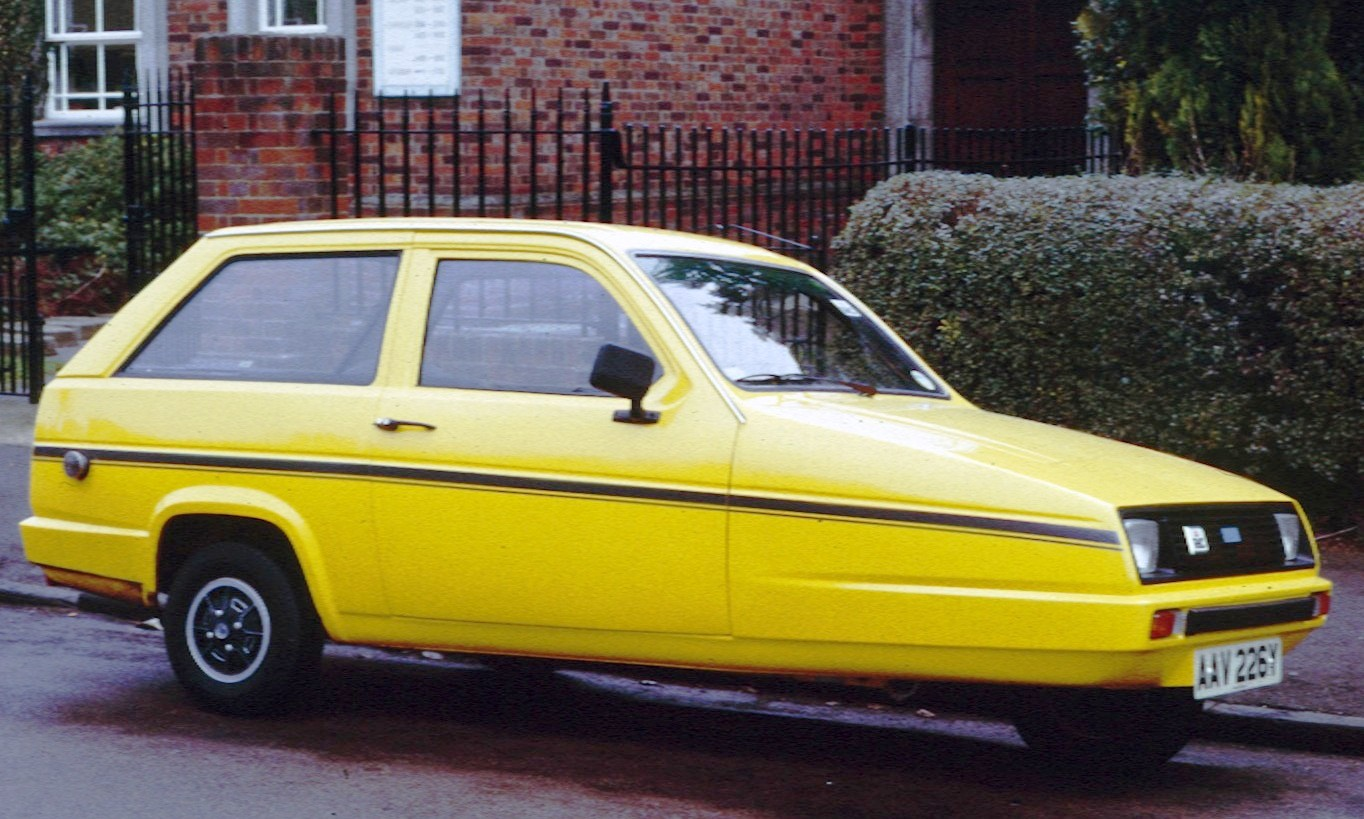
Reliant Rialto Saloon

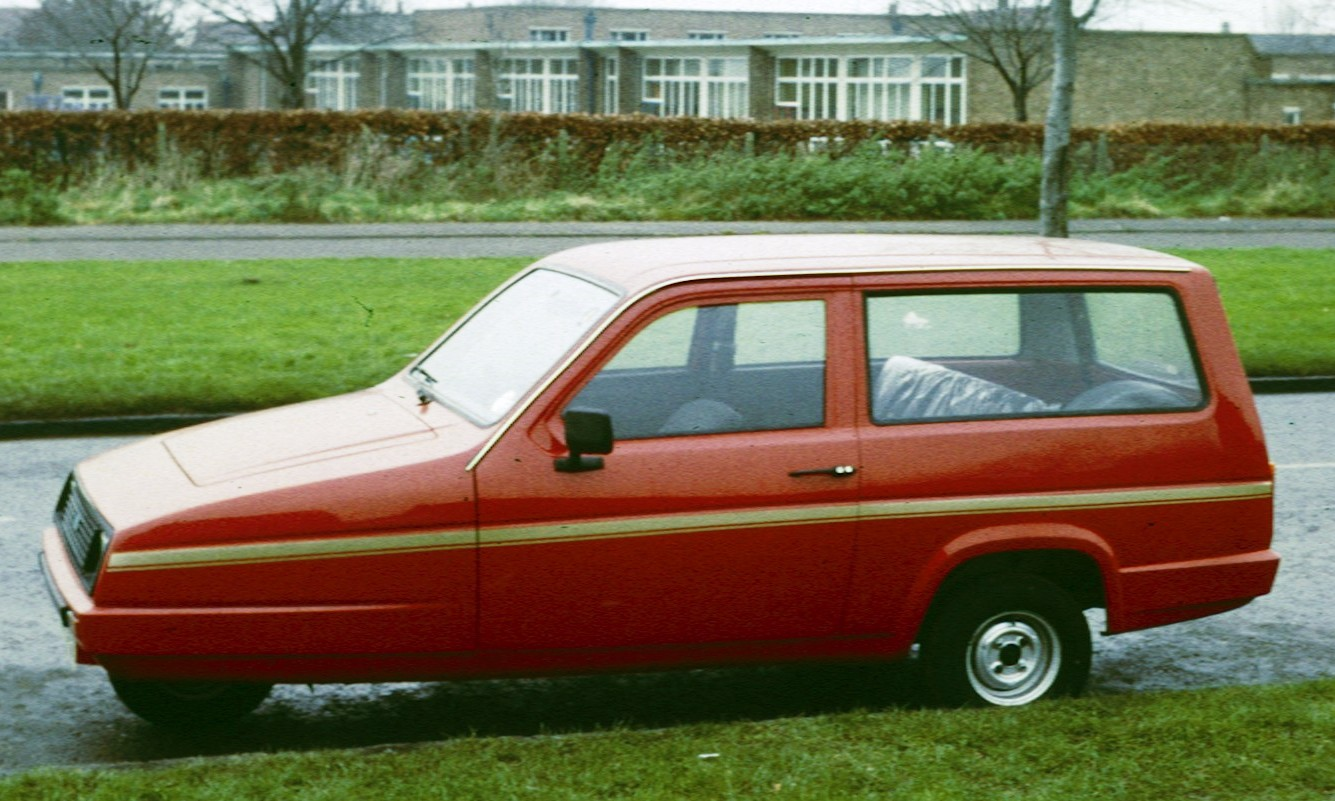
Reliant Rialto Estate

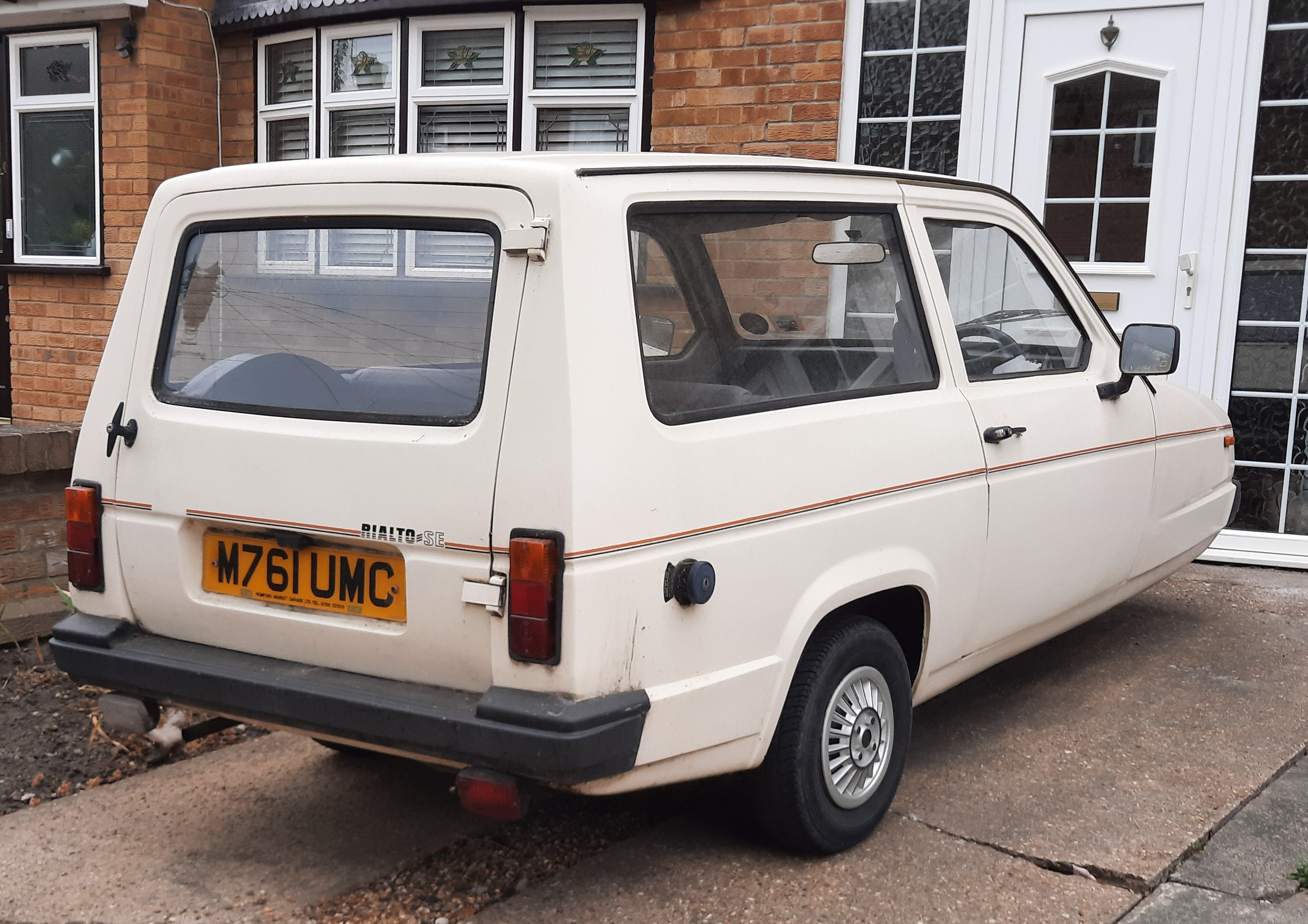
Reliant Rialto Estate (rear)
