= Liege lord (disambiguation) =

Liege lord may refer to:

- Homage (feudal) lord or vassal
- Liege Lord, speed/power metal band

== See also ==
- Liege (disambiguation)
- Lord (disambiguation)
