= Reliant Robin =

Three-wheeled car produced by the Reliant Motor Company (1973–2002)

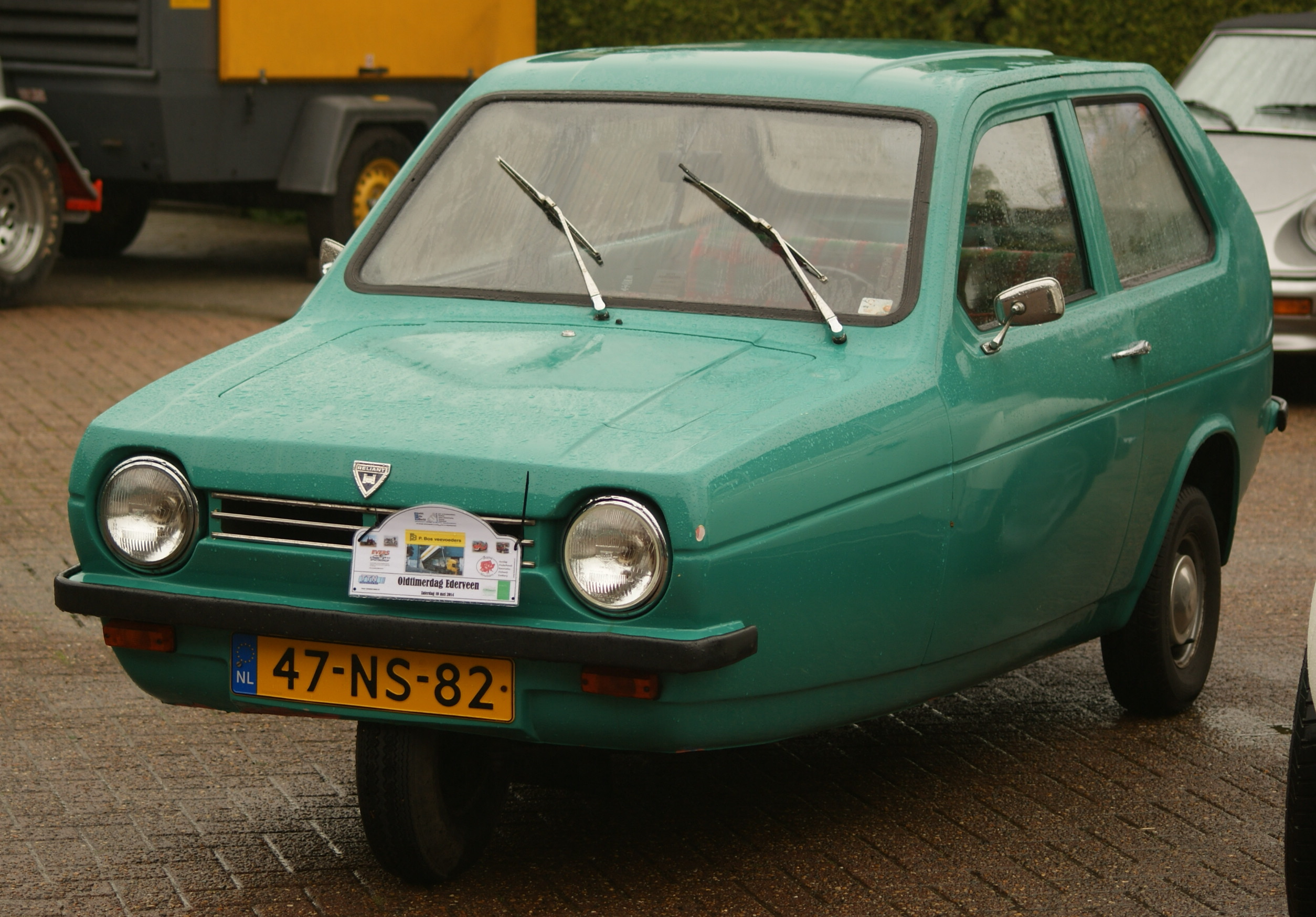
- 1977 Reliant Robin (Mk 1)

Overview
- Manufacturer: Reliant
- Production: October 1973–1981 (UK); 1989–2001 (UK revamped); July 2001 – October 2002 (B&N Plastics)
- Assembly: United Kingdom: Tamworth, England; United Kingdom: Burntwood, England; Greece: Athens (MEBEA: 1974–1978)
- Designer: Ogle Design

Body and chassis
- Class: City car (A)
- Body style: 2-door saloon 3-door estate 3-door hatchback 3-door panel van
- Layout: FMR (Front-mid engine with rear-wheel drive)
- Related: Reliant Regal Van; Reliant Kitten; Reliant Rialto

Powertrain
- Engine: 748 cc OHV I4; 848 cc OHV I4
- Transmission: 4-speed manual all-synchromesh

Dimensions
- Wheelbase: 85 in (2,159 mm)
- Length: 131 in (3,327 mm) (saloon)
- Width: 56 in (1,422 mm)
- Height: 54 in (1,372 mm)

Chronology
- Predecessor: Reliant Regal
- Successor: Reliant Rialto (MK.1)

The Reliant Robin is a small three-wheeled car that was produced by the Reliant Motor Company in Tamworth, England. It was offered in several versions (Mk1, Mk2 and Mk3) over a period of 30 years. It is the second-most popular fibreglass car in history after the Chevrolet Corvette, with Reliant being the second-biggest British car manufacturer for a time.

== History ==
=== Mk. 1 ===
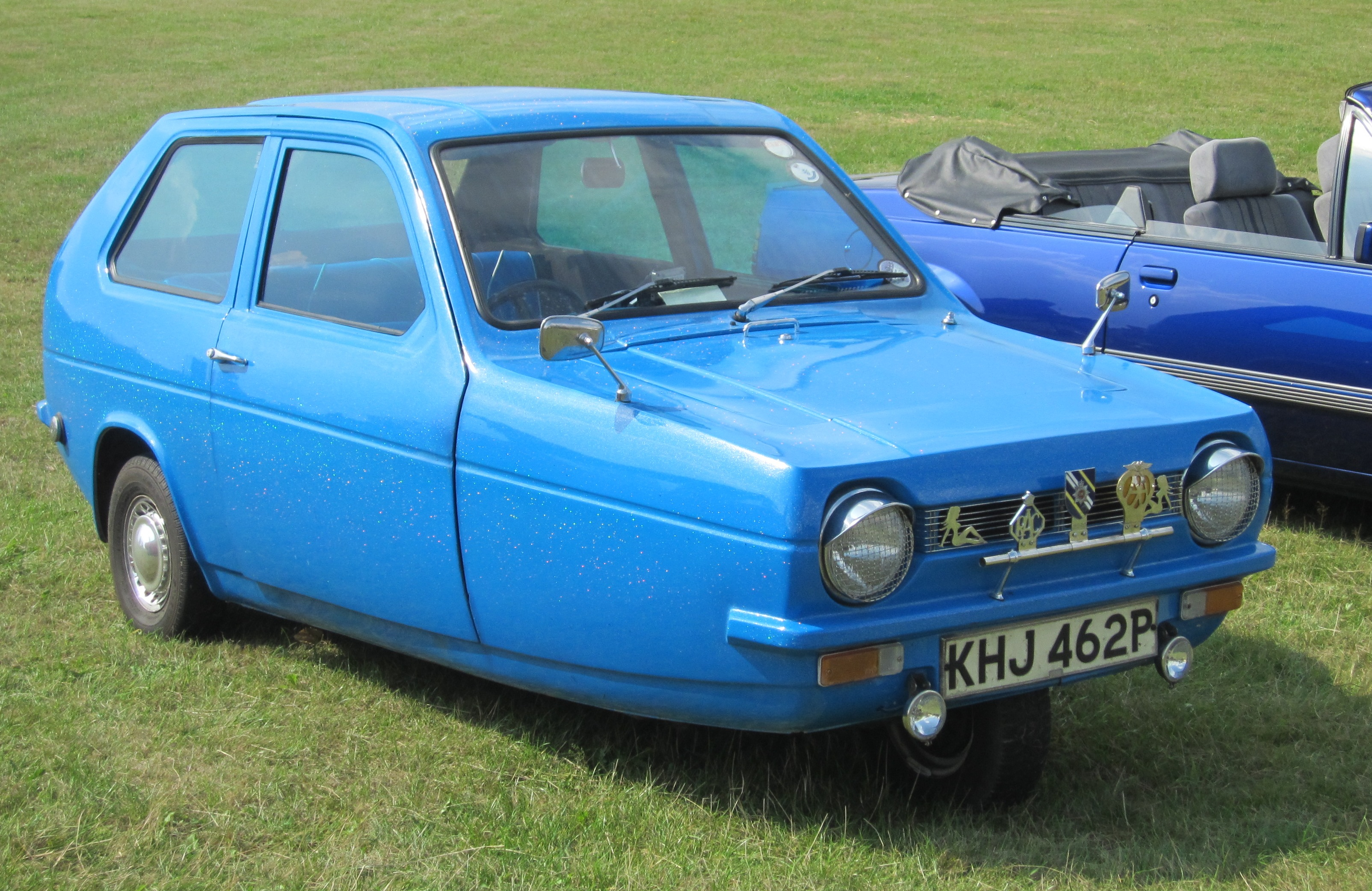

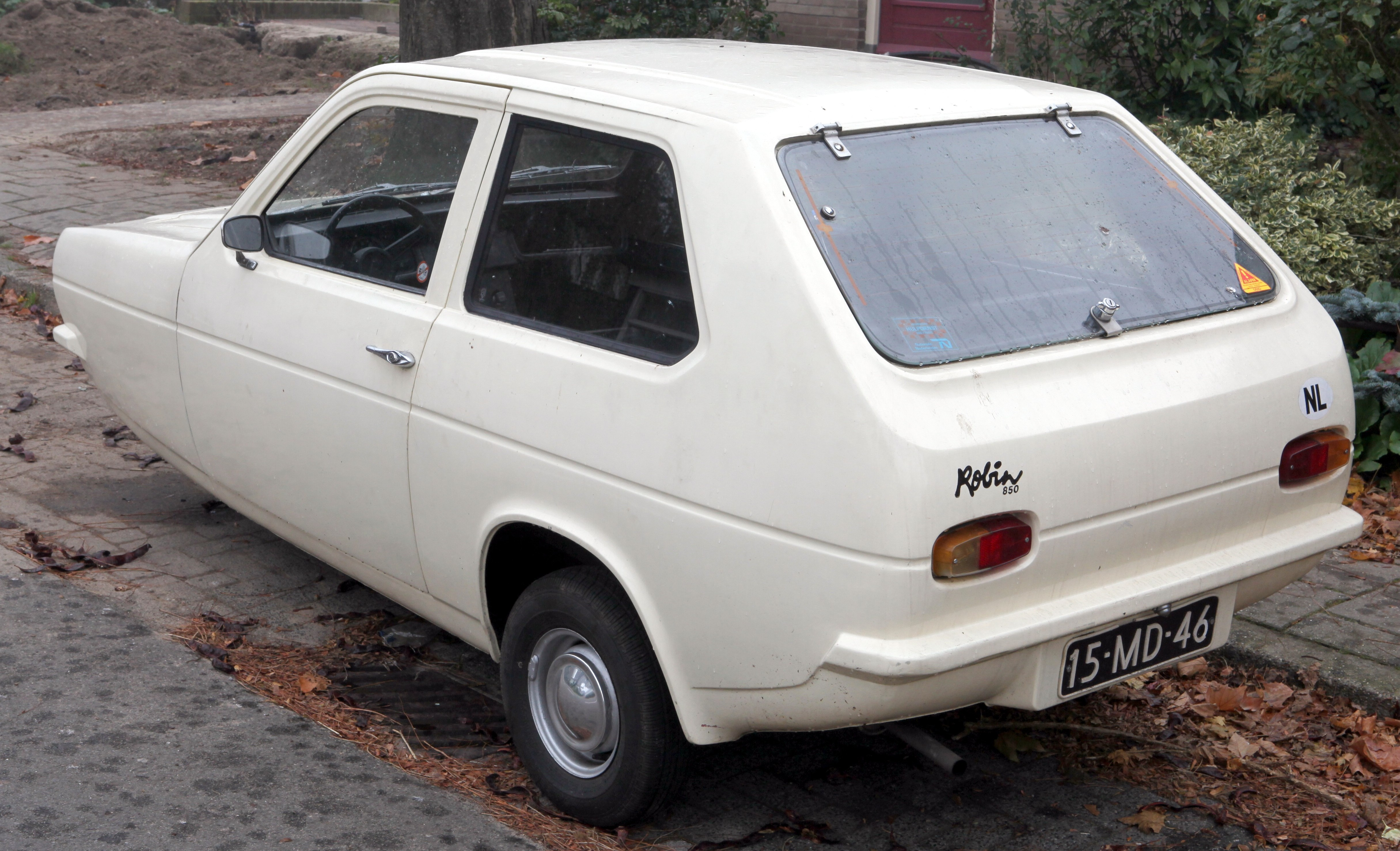
Reliant Robin Mk 1

The Robin was first manufactured in October 1973 as a direct replacement for the Reliant Regal. These models feature a 750 cc engine, but in 1975, the car gained a number of improvements including an engine boost to 850 cc. The Reliant Robin was well received in the 1970s because of good work executed by Ogle Design (who had previously designed the Bond Bug, and Reliant Scimitar) and affordable price, considering 70 and 85 mph (113 and 137 km/h) was possible, and orders increased with the 1970s fuel crisis. The final original version of the Robin rolled off the production line in 1982, and after a number of limited editions, including the GBS and the Jubilee, it was replaced by the restyled Reliant Rialto designed by IAD in Worthing, UK. The vehicle was also produced under licence in Greece by MEBEA between 1974 and 1978.

=== Mk. 2 ===
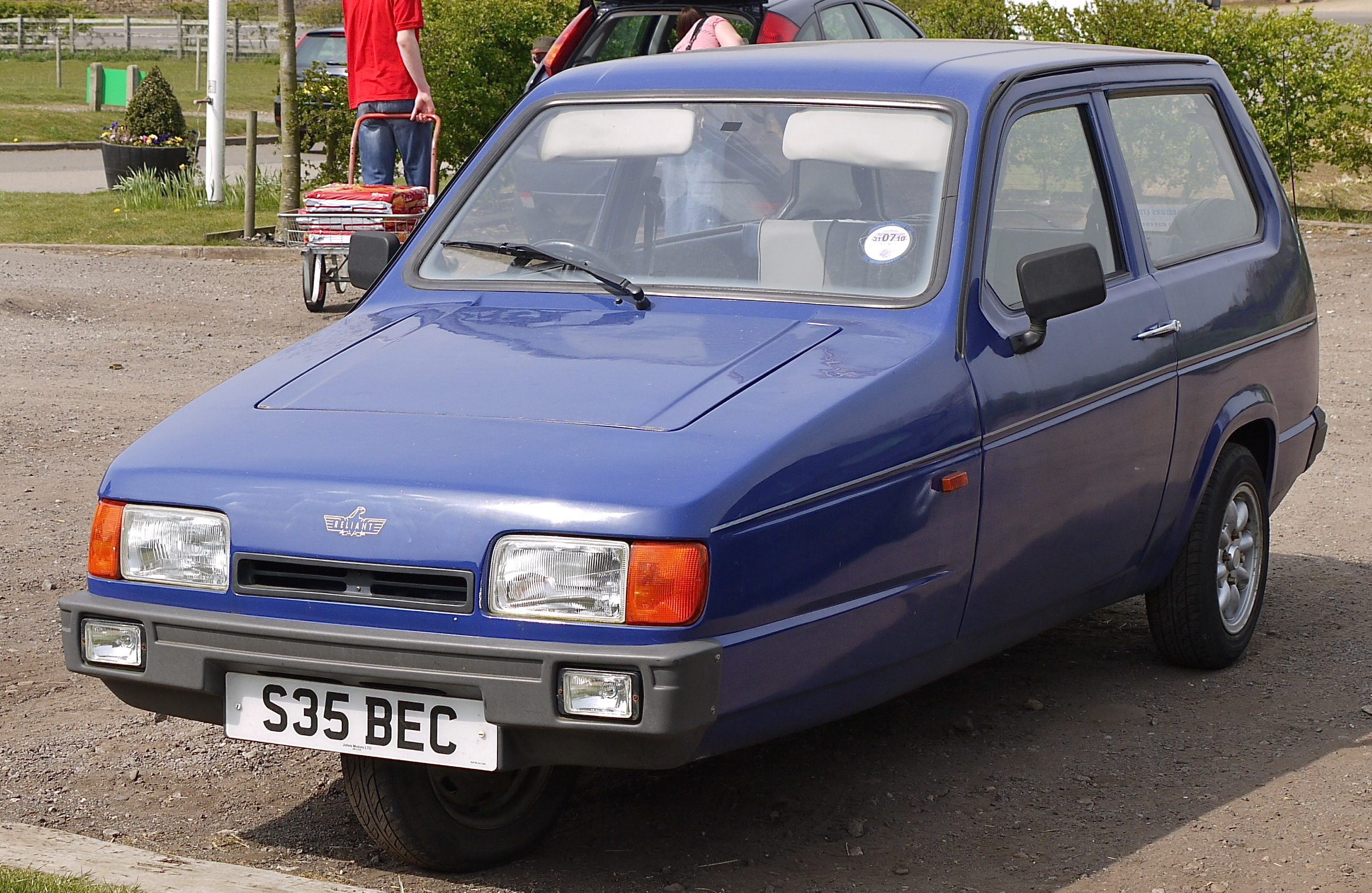

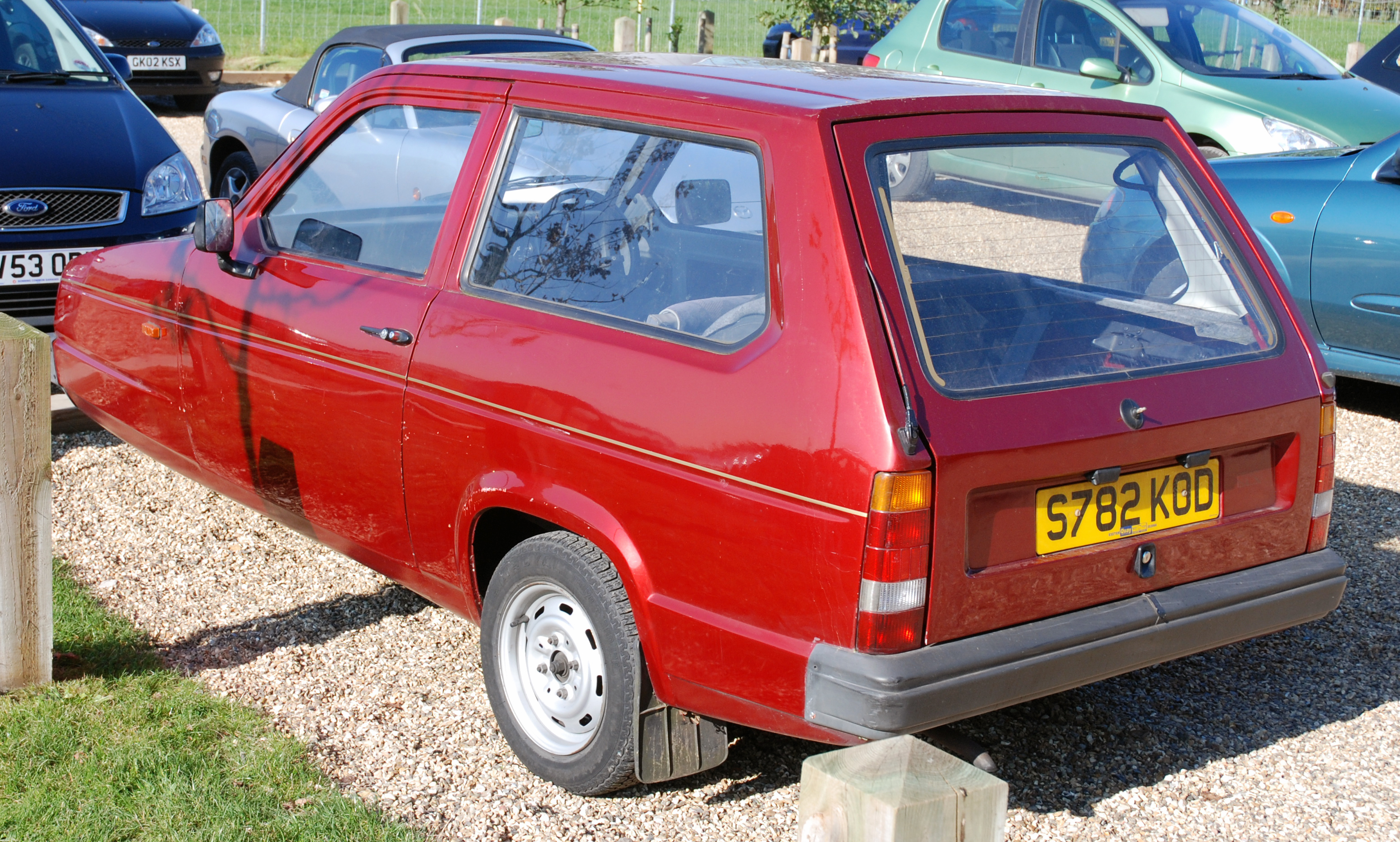
Reliant Robin Mk 2

In 1989, Reliant revived the Robin name, producing a new and totally revamped Robin featuring a new fibreglass body featuring a hatchback, with later an estate and van joining the range. The Rialto continued in production alongside the new Robin until 1996 as purely a cheaper model in saloon, estate and van models also. Later on in production, the Robin received new, 12 inch wheels, improved brakes (from the original mini) and an improved interior with new dials and interior trim. New models joined the range with the LX, SLX, BRG, and Royale models. Royale and BRG models were top of the range and cost over £9,000. New colours such as metallic silver, British racing green, royal blue and NightFire red were used, along with a range of retro-style optional extras such as minilite alloy wheels and jaguar custom seat patterns, which then became available on all Robin models.

=== Mk. 3 ===
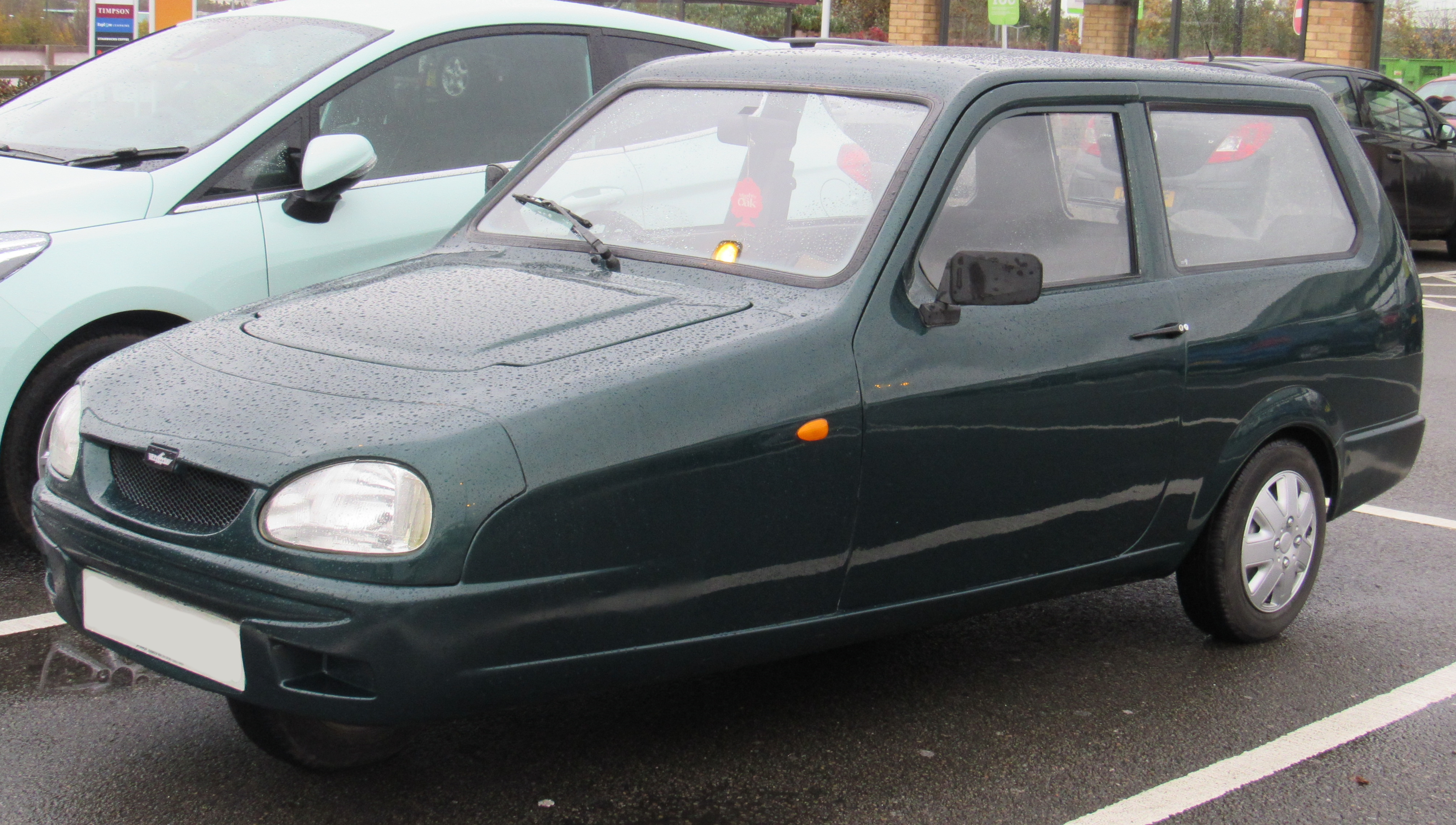

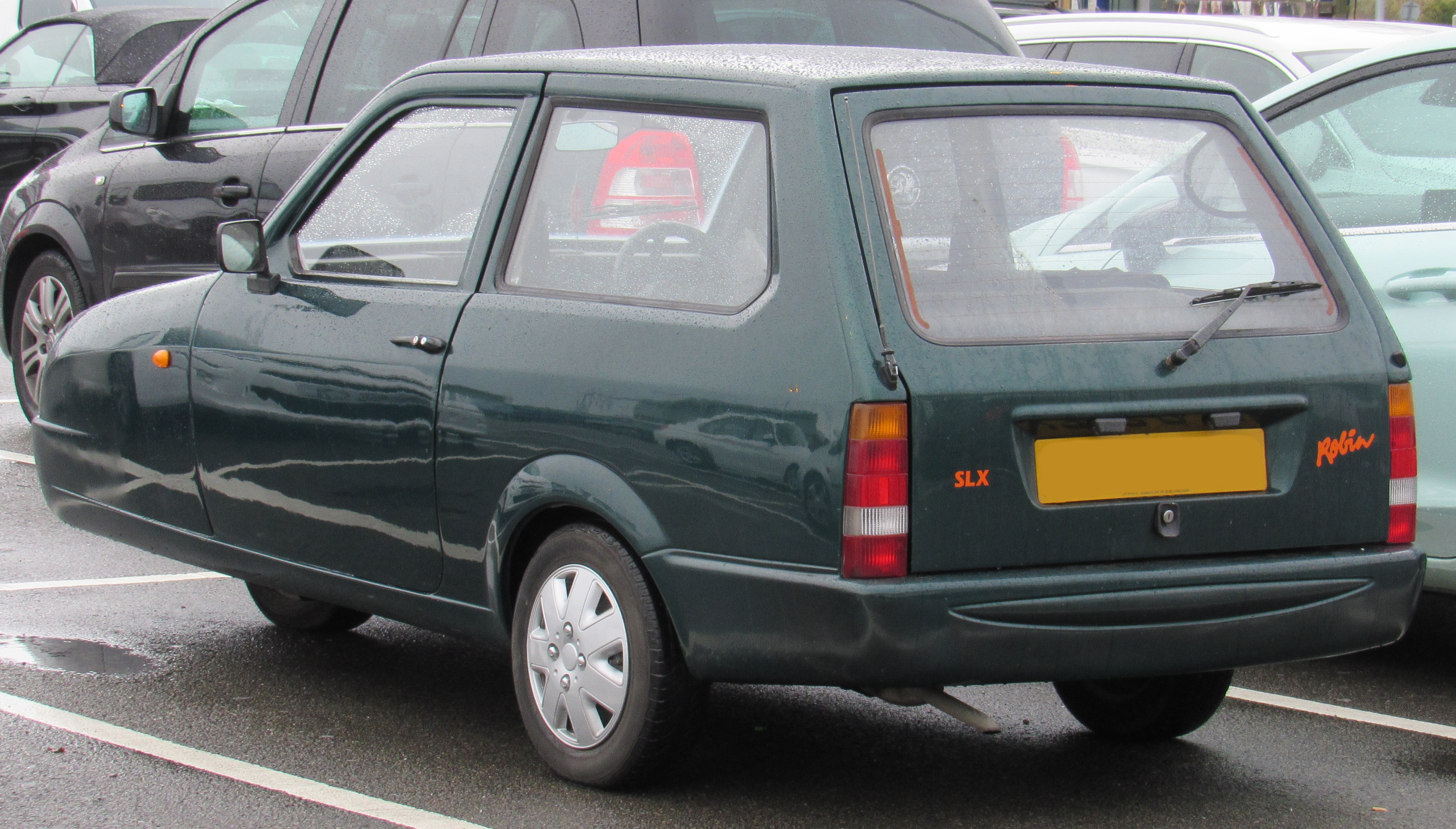
Reliant Robin Mk 3

The Robin was redesigned in 1999, with the design executed by Andy Plumb, chief designer at Reliant at that time. This final version was launched boasting the biggest changes since the original launch, with completely new panels and Vauxhall Corsa front lamps. It was the first Robin to be designed with the use of a computer. An electric and a diesel version along with a pickup variant were conceptualised, but never made. A hatchback van was manufactured.

In 2000, it was announced the final Reliant Robin would be built after 65 limited editions were made. It was named the "Reliant Robin 65" and had a very high specification. All 65s had gold metallic paint, red and grey leather seats, red carpets, walnut dashboards, white dials, minilite alloy wheels, premium stereo systems, electronic ignitions and gold plaques on the dashboards which were individually numbered and bore the original owner's engraved name. The selling price was £10,000. The last Reliant Robin produced was given away by The Sun newspaper in a Valentine's Day competition in 2001.

=== BN-1 and BN-2 ===
Manufacturing of the Robin resumed under licence by B&N Plastics in July 2001. This firm was allowed to produce 250 cars a year, but it was stalled by problems and production faults and went into financial trouble after producing just 40 or so complete cars up to October 2002.

The BN-1 Robin was based on the Robin 65 limited edition, and featured all the expensive extras but with a more modern feature set. The car had a completely redesigned interior, with a new dashboard and interior in black. The body also received some under-the-skin features, including integrated fibreglass skims for the door hinges and a new whole-body fabrication process, which resulted in reduced weight. The revised car was reapproved, so that it was legal for sale in the UK.

The BN-2 Robin was a higher specification model, featuring higher-grade materials for the interior, a custom metallic paint finish, a radio-CD (instead of radio-cassette) and front electric windows, a first for the Robin.

=== General specifications ===
The single wheel in the front is responsible for the steering, while the engine (also in the front) drives the rear axle. The Reliant Robin aimed to provide economical and predictable personal transport. The 850 cc engine gives an acceleration of 0 to 60 mph in 14 seconds and a top speed of 85 mph, they also give a very good economy figure of up to 70 mpg; the later Mk3 Reliant Robin was quoted to give 60 to 100 mpg.

=== Licence requirements ===
Despite its size, by being a three-wheeler with an official mass below 450 kg (992 lb), the Robin could traditionally be driven by holders of a B1 category driving licence in the United Kingdom, and registered and taxed at motorcycle rates, which gave a saving of £55 a year over a conventional car. Up until 2001, the B1 licence entitlement was given to those who passed the category A motorcycle test, leading to the common misconception that people could drive a Robin on a motorcycle licence. Those passing their motorcycle test after 2001 could not drive a Robin, until the law changed in December 2012. As of 29 December 2012, tricycles such as the Robin no longer fall within the B1 category licence; in-line with European Union law, tricycles are now classified under the category A "motorcycle licence". As such, any person holding a "full motorcycle licence" may legally drive a Robin. As it was not the licence entitlement that changed, but rather the categorisation of tricycles into an existing category, the change applies to all holders of category A motorcycle licences, whenever they were obtained. Shortly after this an oversight was that a person with a full car licence could no longer drive a three-wheeled vehicle; this was then altered by the UK government after car companies which produce three-wheeled vehicles (such as Morgan) protested over the licensing changes, this resulted in car licence holders now being able to drive a three-wheeled vehicle, but an age limit of 21 was also added; this 21 or over age limit also applies to motorcycle category A licence holders.

Reliant Robin Graveyard, East Tilbury, United Kingdom, 2021

==== Driving a Reliant with a motorcycle licence (United Kingdom regulations) ====
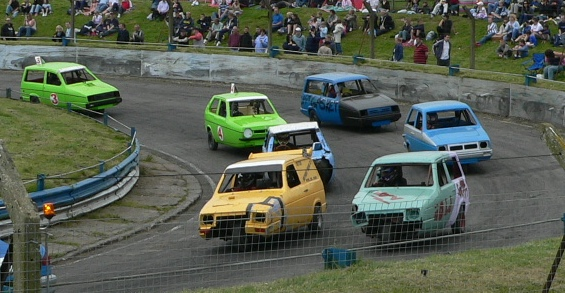
A group of Reliant Robins and Rialtos in use as banger racers

Originally, it was possible to drive a three-wheeled Reliant with a motorcycle permit, as a full motorcycle permit included a B1 class endorsement, which gave a driver the right to drive vehicles with three or four wheels of up to 550 kg (10¾ cwt). However, the DVLA ceased to issue the B1 endorsement in 2001.

Interest in the Reliant increased once more after January 2013, when the licensing scheme was changed once again. From 2013, a holder of a full category A motorcycle licence over the age of 21 may drive a three-wheeled vehicle of any power. This age restriction applies to full Category B holders also. In a further change in 2014, the UK government created a new descriptor "motor tricycles with power output over 15kW" within the top-level category A (including its related driver age restriction of 21 years), into which the Reliant 3 wheeler range fits.

Because of these licensing changes, a Reliant Robin cannot be driven with a provisional licence; unless the driver meets certain disability criteria.

== In popular culture ==
Miss Shepherd owned one Reliant Robin in The Lady in the Van, a 1989 book, 1999 play and 2015 film by Alan Bennett, a real-life portrayal of a case of Diógenes syndrome.

According to BBC News, the Reliant Robin was "made famous by" and is often associated with the comedy show Only Fools and Horses. This is despite the fact that the yellow three-wheeled van used in the show was actually a Reliant Regal.

Joanna Lumley remarks, as the character Patsy Stone, that her friend Edina Monsoon's isolation tank "looks like a Robin Reliant" in the 1992 episode Iso Tank of the British sitcom Absolutely Fabulous.

In both the 1990 novel by Neil Gaiman and Terry Pratchett and the TV series released in 2019, the Reliant Robin makes an appearance in Good Omens. The character Pulsifer Newton (in series 1) drives the vehicle, which he names after Dick Turpin.

Beginning on 24 October 2025, a pair of men, one, a Canadian from Victoria BC, attempted to drive a Mk. 3 Robin the 10,000 miles from London to Cape Town. The journey was undertaken in an effort to both break the world record for longest distance driven in a three-wheeled car, and to raise money for the England-based School in a Bag charity. Despite needing to replace the Robin's engine approximately halfway through the trip, the pair reached Cape Town on 11 March 2026, with the Robin having traveled approximately 10,000 miles across 22 countries in 130 days.

=== Top Gear ===
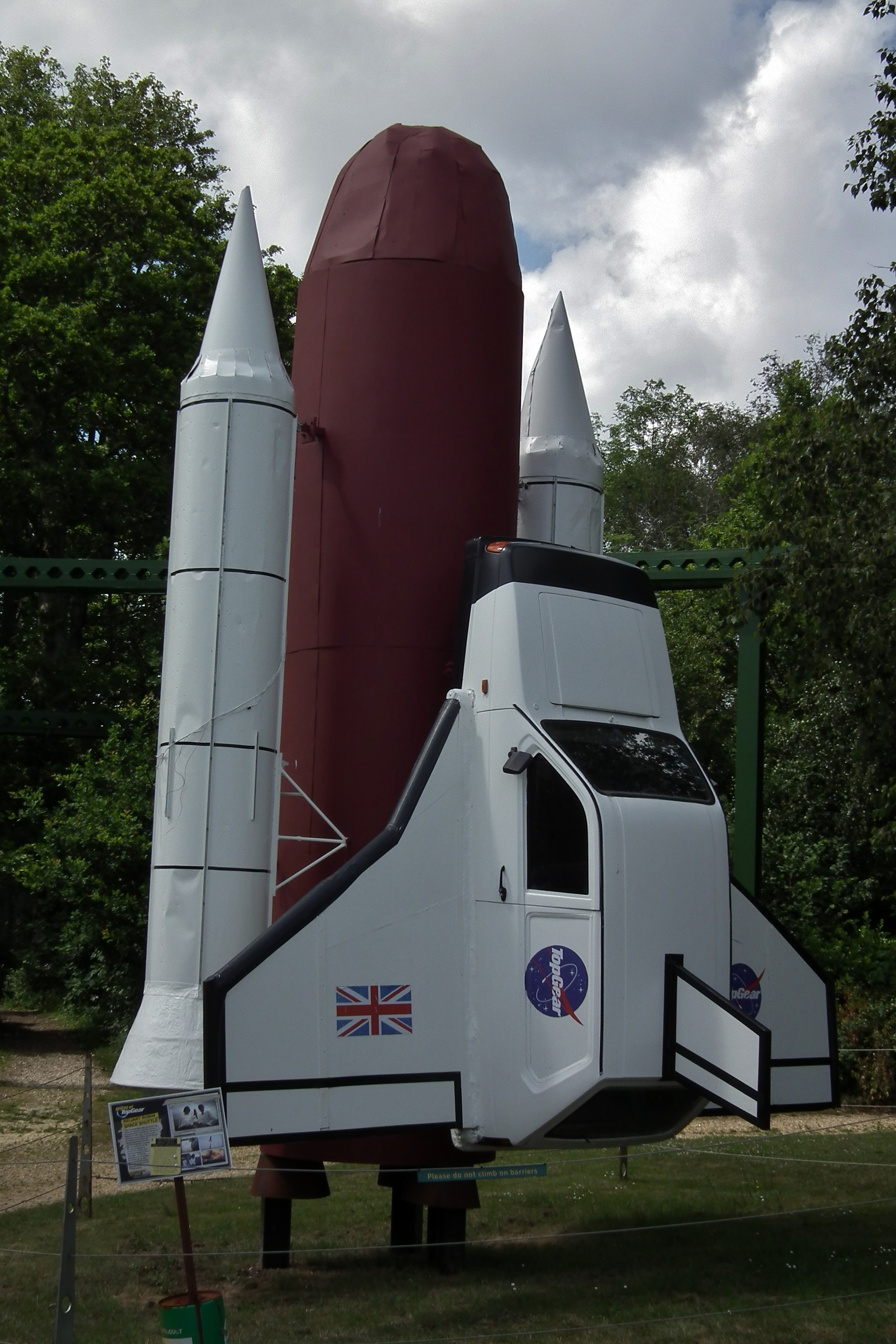
A replica of the Reliant Robin Space Shuttle used in Top Gear

On 18 February 2007 episode of Top Gear (series 9, episode 4), a Reliant Robin was used by Richard Hammond and James May in an attempt to modify a normal K-reg Robin into a reusable Space Shuttle. The booster rockets separated cleanly, but the fuel tank did not detach, and the Robin exploded on touchdown.

In a subsequent episode of Top Gear (series 15, episode 1), a modified 1994 Reliant Robin was used by Jeremy Clarkson to drive 14 miles from Sheffield to Rotherham. He described driving it as dangerous as "inviting your mum 'round for an evening on Chatroulette", and that the Robin "wasn't funny, it was a complete menace". During the segment, Clarkson rolled a specially side-weighted Robin at least six times. The following two episodes featured racing driver The Stig and Ken Block on their test track in Robins, and neither of them could finish a clean lap in the specially doctored Robin. Later on, Clarkson admitted that the Robin used in the show had the differential modified to allow "the poor little thing" to roll over easily. The car also had unequal sized wheels fitted creating an imbalance toward the driver's side.

== See also ==
- Biotechnia Ellinikon Trikyklon – Greek manufacturer of three-wheeled vehicles
- Liège
