= Liège (car) =

Car

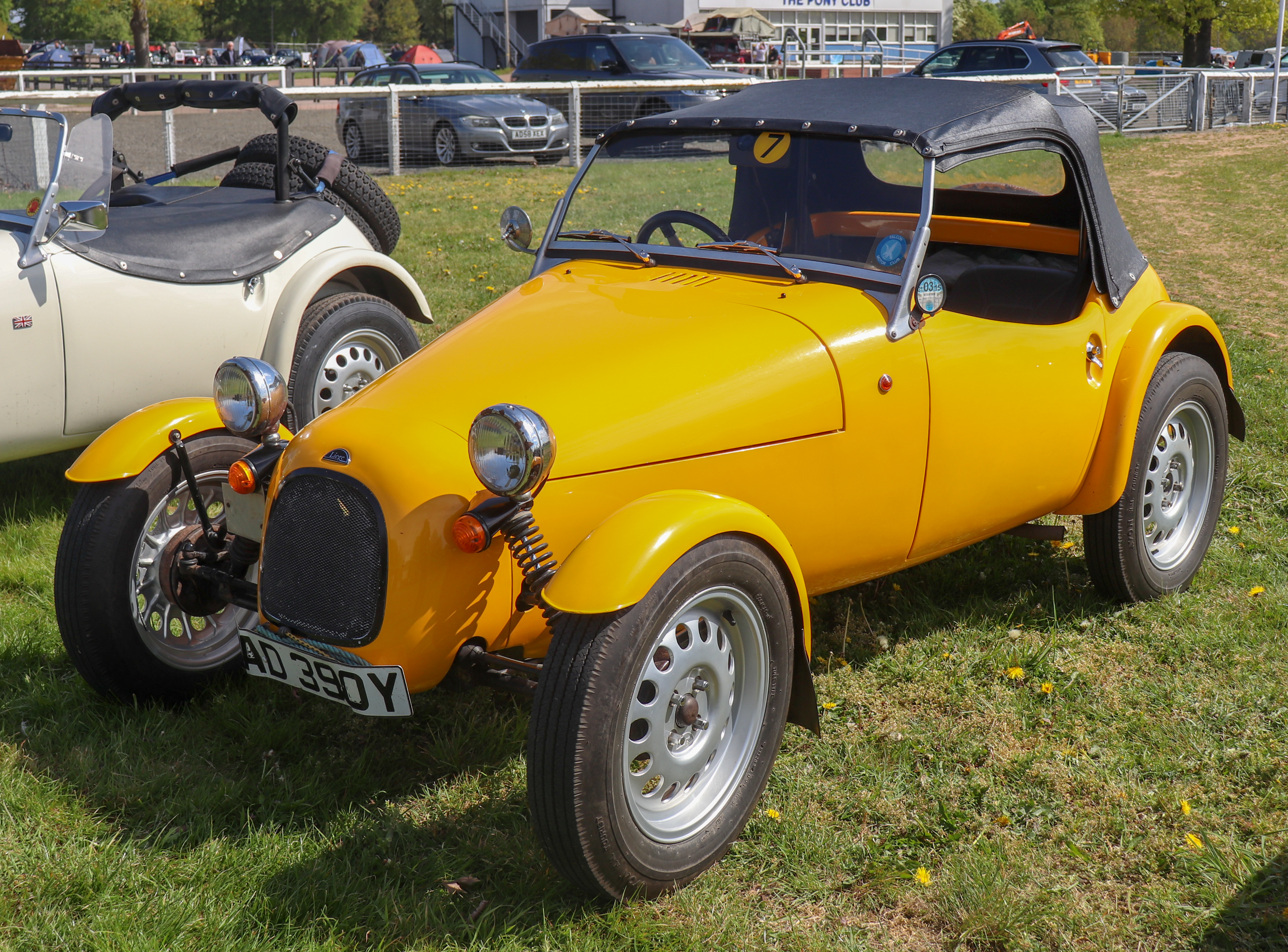
A yellow Liège

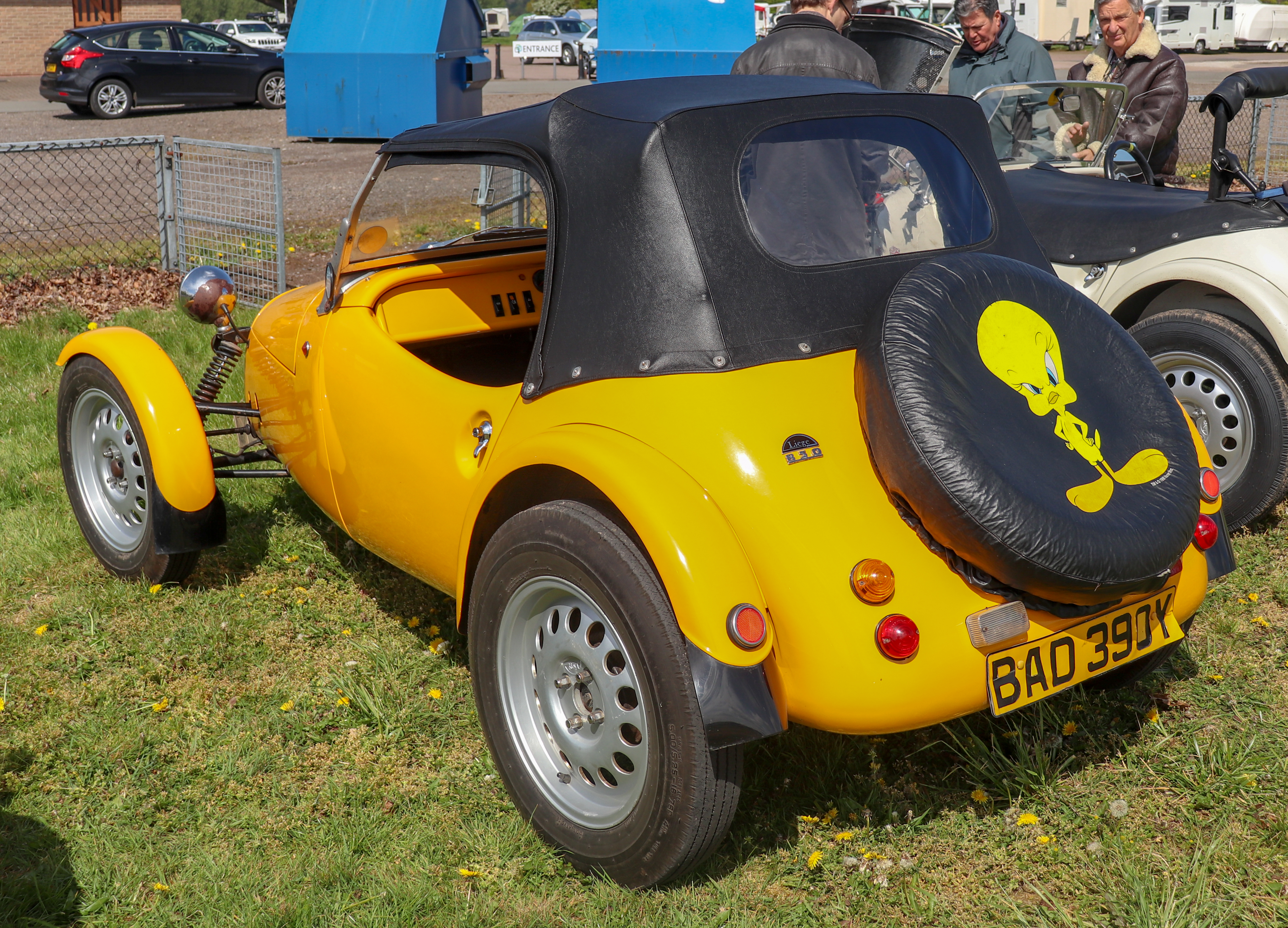
Rear

The Liège is a lightweight two-seater car. An original design by Peter Davis, inspired by the classic sporting car era of the 1950s.

Sixty of these cars were supplied, mainly in component form between 1997 and 2007. Designed and developed from 1985 to 1996 in Bidford-on-Avon, Warwickshire, England. Manufactured at Craycombe in Fladbury, Worcestershire. Their agility off-road led to their being used in Classic Reliability Trials as organised by the Motor Cycling Club.

The Liège has a glass fibre body with an integral floor bonded in. The chassis is a simple but strong ‘A’ frame, with independent double wishbone front suspension. The live rear axle is from the Suzuki Carry which has a 5.1-1 ratio to suit the 16-inch-diameter (410 mm) Liège cast aluminium wheels. Coilspring shock absorbers are used all round. The 850 cc four-cylinder aluminium engine is from a Reliant Robin. The braking, being period, has 7-inch (180 mm) Reliant-spec drums front and rear. The spare wheel mounted on the back allowed a small space in the rear for soft luggage and all-weather equipment. A number of owners converted their car to use a Suzuki GLS 1.0 engine, coupled to a Suzuki Jimny 5 speed gearbox. This requires the bodyshell to be removed so that alternative mounts can be welded on.

== See also ==
- Dellow
