= Borg-Warner 35 transmission =

Type of automatic transmission for motor vehicles

The Borg-Warner 35 (or BW-35) is an automatic transmission produced by the BorgWarner company, with variants including the 36 and 37. These transmissions have an aluminum housing, three forward-drive ratios, and one reverse-drive ratio.

Early models have two drive positions; the quadrant is labelled P–R-N-D2-D1-L for Park, Reverse, Neutral, D2, D1, and Lock. These models start off in second gear when in the D2 position. When placed in the D1 position the transmission starts in first gear and shifts up through second to third. In "Lock" the transmission can be locked to prevent upward gear changes for maximum engine braking in first gear and moderate engine braking in second. Selecting L while stopped, or before the transmission has upshifted into second gear, keeps the transmission in first gear. Selecting L from D2 or D1 while in 2nd gear will lock the transmission in second gear; selecting L from D2 or D1 when cruising below 55 miles per hour (89 km/h) will cause an immediate 3-2 downshift and lock in 2nd gear; the transmission will automatically shift into first gear when the car speed drops below 5 miles per hour (8.0 km/h).

Some vehicles had the same system without the D1 and D2, instead just having D, and only 5 stations on the quadrant.

Starting in 1965, the quadrant was standardized to P–R-N-D-2-1, for Park, Reverse, Neutral, Drive, Second, First. AMC called this "Shift-Command" to differentiate it from the D2/D1 models, since either could be ordered in an AMC/Rambler automobile from 1965 to 1967.

The BW-36 was introduced in 1965. It is essentially the same as the 35 except that it has provisions for an external transmission oil cooler. The 35 was air cooled by a fan on the torque converter; the 35 case has provisions to be drilled for an external cooler, but no U.S. models used an external cooler and do not have the internal provisions to mount one. Volvo used an external cooler integrated into the engine radiator on models including the 1800E and 1800ES. An external oil cooler made the 36 suitable for heavier vehicles and towing heavier loads. AMC used the BW-36 behind the 232 six in their Ambassador starting in 1965.

The BW-37 is first mentioned in the 1967 AMC Technical Service Manual (TSM). It was used behind the 232 in larger vehicles. It has a higher torque rating than the 35 and the 36.

== Description ==
The Borg Warner 35 automatic transmission comprises a torque converter and a 3-speed hydraulically-controlled epicyclic geartrain. Torque applied to the transmission via the torque converter drives a hydraulic fluid pump. As the gears move faster or slower, pressure of the fluid increases or decreases in the case. Mechanical shifting of gears is triggered by the increase or decrease in pressure. There is a throttle pressure valve in the valve body, which is connected to the throttle linkage via a cable. This regulates internal pressure by throttle position. A secondary function of this cable is to shift down to a lower gear when the accelerator is floored and road speed is below a set point regulated by a mechanical governor on the output shaft.

The hydraulic control system consists of a valve arrangement and an engine driven pump. The automatic transmission contains a planetary gear set consisting of two sun gears, two sets of three planet pinions contained within a planetary carrier, and ring gear. The drive gear ratios are obtained by holding or clutching various combinations of elements of the planetary train. This is performed by two bands, two multi-disc clutches, and a one-way overrunning clutch.

The Borg Warner 35 was designed for use with Type F transmission fluid, which is far less common today than the Mercon or Dexron types.

== Applications ==
The BW-35 was initially produced in the U.S. in the 1950s specifically for engines of less than 200 cubic inches engine displacement and less than 140 hp (100 kW) (American Motors Rambler and Studebaker mainly). It was more efficient than previous automatics and was quite successful in the US, and popular with European automakers as well. Production was expanded in 1960 to the Borg-Warner plant at Letchworth in Great Britain.

The BW-35 was also manufactured in Australia from 1963 and was used on numerous Australian-made cars.

=== AMC ===
Used behind the 195.6, 199 and 232 six cylinder

- Ambassador 1965-1969
- American 1963-1968
- Rambler 1969
- Rogue 1967-1969
- Classic 1963-1966
- Rebel 1967-1969
- Marlin 1965-1967
- Javelin 1968-1969

=== Austin ===
- FX4 - FL2 (ADO 6)
- A60 Cambridge (ADO 38)
- Freeway (Australia - ADO 40 (Mk I) and YDO 3 (Mk II))
- A110 Westminster (ADO 53 - Mk II only)
- 1800 - 2200 (ADO 17) - Model 35TA - Transverse Installation Using Morse Hy-Vo chain to transmit the drive.
- 3 Litre (ADO 61)
- Kimberley and Tasman (Australia YDO 19) Transverse installation.
- 18-22 (ADO 71) Transverse installation.
- Ambassador (LM19) Transverse installation.

=== Citroën ===
- Citroën DS Longitudinal two shaft transaxle installation.
- Citroën SM Longitudinal two shaft transaxle installation.

=== Daimler ===
- 2.5 V8 - 250
- SP250 Dart

=== Datsun ===
- 1967 Datsun RL411 SSS (SuperSportSedan) and 1600 ('Bluebird'); (same engine as the SR311 'Fairlady' roadsters).
- Datsun PL510 - Optional on both sedans and wagons.

=== Holden ===
- Torana HB Only

=== Jaguar ===
- XJ6 Series 1, engine size 2.8
- Mark 2
- S-Type

=== Leyland ===
- Princess (ADO 71) Transverse Installation
- P76 (Australia - used with both 2.6l six cylinder and 4.4l V8)

The 4.4l V8 engine may be the largest capacity engine ever fitted to a Model 35.

=== Mazda ===
- 1500
- 1800

=== MG ===
- MGB Mk II
- MGB GT
- MGC Roadster
- MGC GT
- Magnette IV (ADO 38)

=== Morris ===
- Oxford Series VI (ADO 38)
- Marina (ADO 28)
- 1800 - 2200 (ADO 17) Transverse installation.
- 18-22 (ADO 71) Transverse Installation

=== Reliant ===
- Scimitar GTE SE5 (1968–72) and SE5A (1972–75) with Essex V6.

=== Riley ===
- 4/72 (ADO 38)

=== The Rootes group (United Kingdom) (later Chrysler UK) ===
- Hillman Minx, Super Minx, Hunter, Minx (Arrow range 1725cc only)
- Humber Hawk, Super Snipe, Imperial, Sceptre, Arrow range Sceptre
- Singer Gazelle, Vogue, Vogue (Arrow range), Gazelle (Arrow range 1725 cc only)
- Sunbeam Alpine, Rapier, Rapier (Arrow range), Alpine(Arrow range), Vogue (Arrow range)
- Hillman Avenger & Plymouth Cricket 1250, 1300, 1500 & 1600

In the mid-1970s, the Arrow & Avenger ranges switched to a B-W Type 45 4-speed transmission

=== Rover ===
- 3 Litre - 3.5 Litre (P5 & P5B) 1968-1973
- 2000 - 3500 (P6 & P6B) 1963-1973
- Rover P6 1974-1977 BW65 Borg warner model 65

=== Saab ===
- Saab 99, 900, 90 (1970 to 1993) Models 35 & 37 - longitudinal installation using Morse Hy-Vo chain to transmit the drive.

Model 35 1970-1980 models

Model 37 1979-1994

=== Toyota ===
- Corona Australian Production From 1969.
- Crown Australian Production From 1968 (Imported Crowns during this period used Aisin A30 & A40 transmissions)

=== Triumph ===
- 2000 - 2500
- Stag

Early 1971-73

- Dolomite

Early 1972-73

=== Vauxhall ===
- Viva HB Only

=== Volvo ===
- Volvo Amazon
- Volvo P1800
- Volvo 140 Series
- Volvo 164
- Volvo 200 Series

1964-1976 model years

=== Wolseley ===
- 16/60 (ADO 38)
- 24/80 (Australia - ADO 40 (Mk I) and YDO 3 (Mk II))
- 6/110 (ADO 53 - Mk II Only)
- 18/85 (ADO 17) Transverse installation.
- Six (ADO 17) Transverse installation.
- Saloon (ADO 71) Transverse installation.

=== Ford UK & Australia ===
- Taunus TC1 & TC2
- Escort Mk1
- Capri Mk1
- Cortina Mk1, Mk2 & early Mk3
- Corsair V4
- mk3 zodiac and zephyr

Australian Ford Falcons from 1963 to 1985 were offered with the Borg-Warner 35, among other, Ford-built automatics.

=== Chrysler (Australia) ===
From 1967 to 1981, the Borg-Warner 35 transmission was also used in the 6-cylinder Australian Chrysler Valiants, Chargers, and Centuras, supplanting the Chrysler-built Torqueflite in response to Australian local-content requirements.
