= Tom Karen =

British industrial designer (1926–2022)

Tom Karen OBE
- Born: 20 March 1926; Vienna, Austria
- Died: 31 December 2022 (aged 96)
- Education: Loughborough College
- Occupation: Industrial designer
- Title: Managing director and chief designer of Ogle Design
- Term: 1962–1999

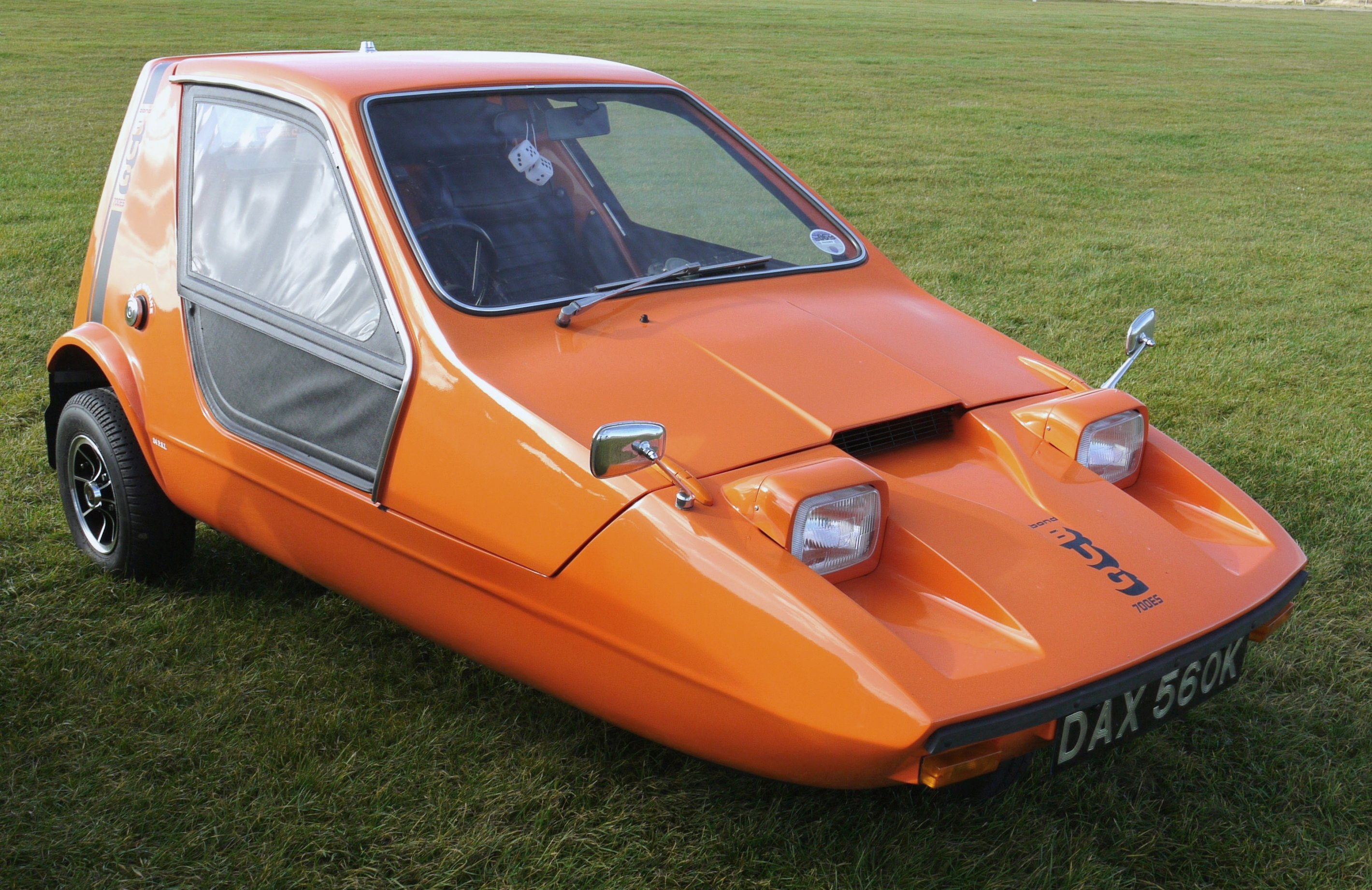
Bond Bug

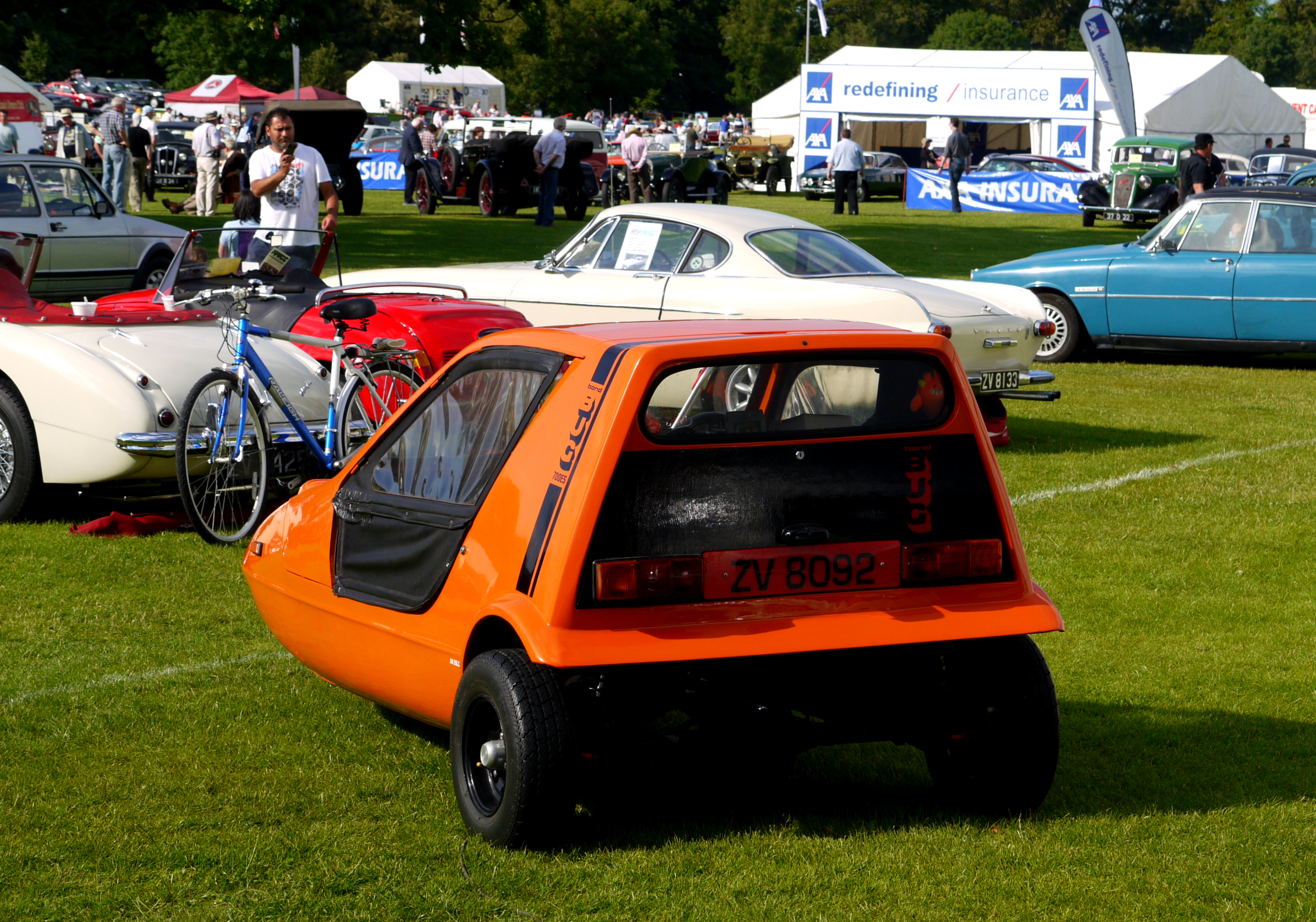
Bond Bug, rear view

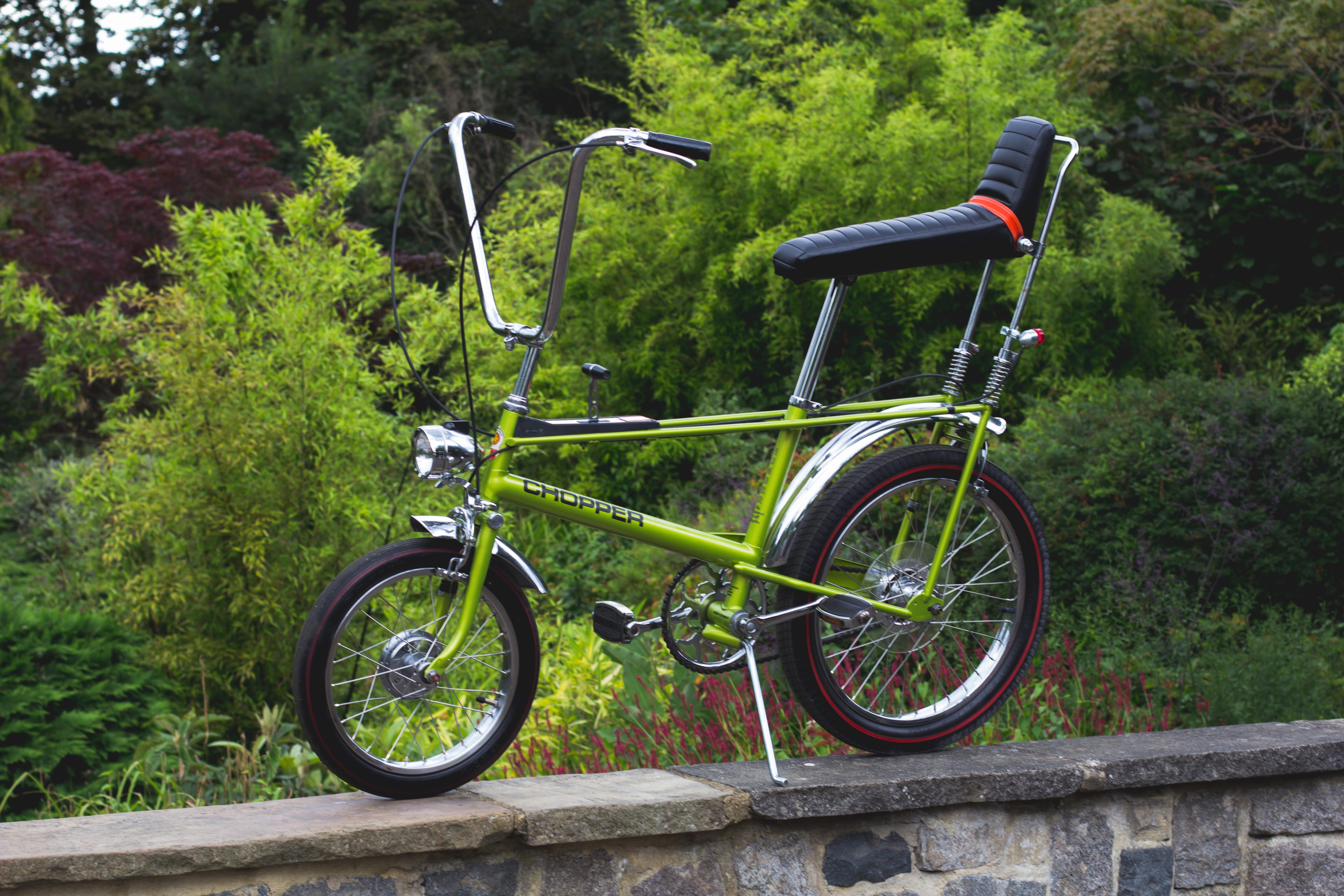
Karen's sketches of the 1970s Chopper bike are held in the Victoria and Albert Museum

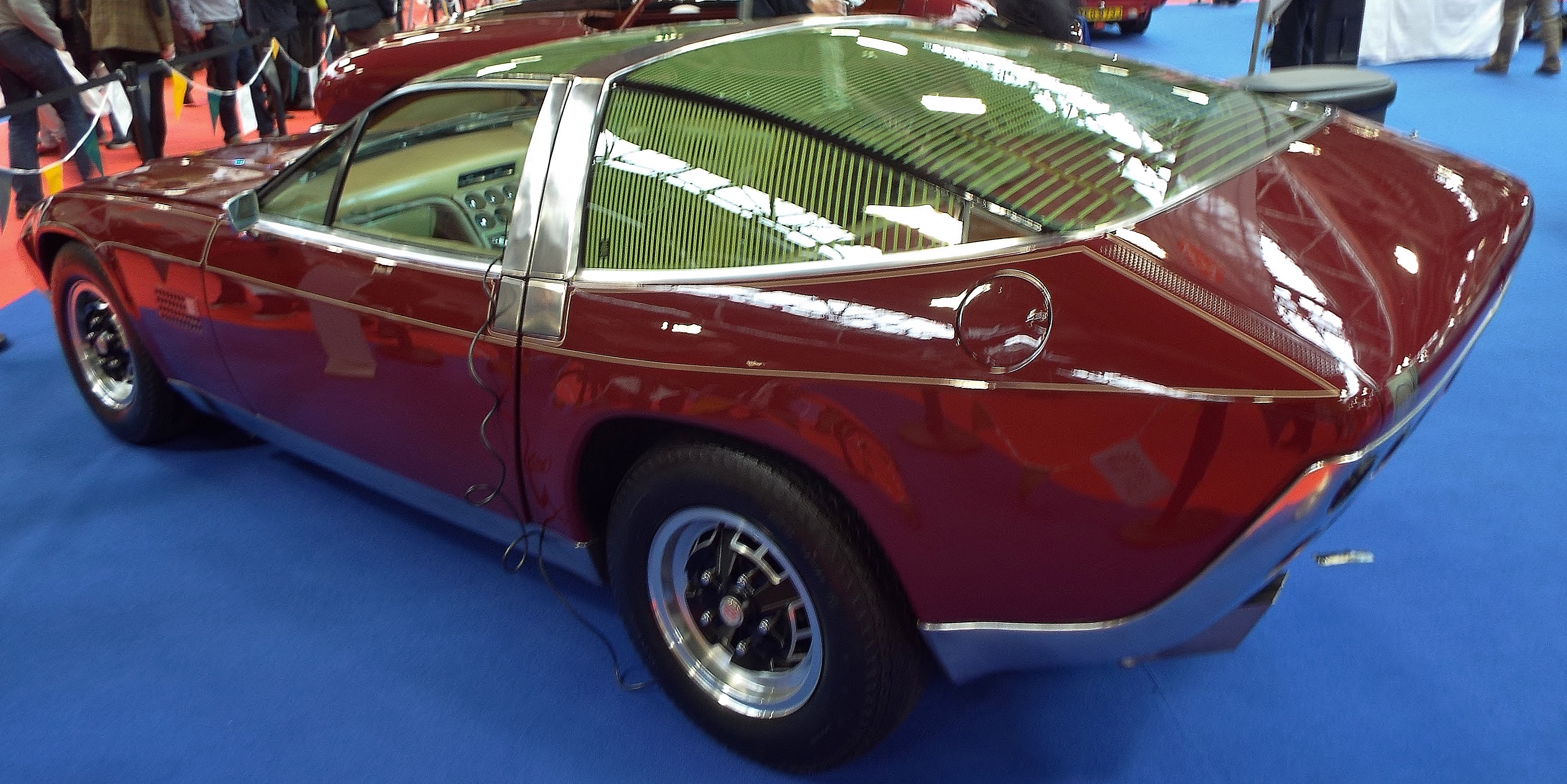
Ogle Aston Martin show car

Thomas Josef Derrick Paul Karen OBE (20 March 1926 – 31 December 2022) was a British industrial designer. He was managing director and chief designer of Ogle Design from 1962 until 1999. Karen oversaw design of the Bush Radio TR130 radio, the Raleigh Chopper (along with Alan Oakley), the Bond Bug, the Reliant Scimitar GTE, the Anadol A1 (FW5), a series of lorry cabs for Leyland, and the Marble Run toy (sold by Kiddicraft).

== Early life ==
Karen was born as Thomas Kohn in Vienna on 20 March 1926, to a Jewish father and a Catholic mother, and went to school in Brno. The family left Czechoslovakia in 1939, and Karen reached England in 1942. He studied aeronautical engineering at Loughborough College.

== Career ==
Karen worked for Hunting Percival, makers of the Proctor and the Provost trainer, then the Air Registration Board. He enrolled at the Central School of Arts and Crafts. He joined the Ford design studio in 1955, where he won The Institute of British Carriage and Automobile Manufacturers car design competition and worked on the interior trim for the Ford Anglia 105E.

After leaving Ford, Karen then worked briefly for David Ogle at the formation of Ogle Design. He did not stay very long, moving to Hotpoint as Senior Designer, before moving onto Philips, where he became Product Design Manager, setting up their studio for white goods. While at Hotpoint he won a Design award for products he created.

In 1962, Karen was invited to take charge of Ogle Design following the death of David Ogle from a car accident in Karen's design, the Ogle SX1000. He was managing director and chief designer until 1999. Cars designed by Karen include the Reliant Scimitar, the Reliant Robin and its cousin the Reliant Kitten, plus the Bond Bug. During his time at Ogle, he designed Luke Skywalker's Landspeeder for the Star Wars films; the Landspeeder was built around the chassis of a Bond Bug. and the first Turkish car, the Anadol A1. Karen designed the Triplex Aston Martin show car in 1972.

In 1969, Ogle Design, under Tom Karen, was given the task to design a modern caravan for the recently acquired Eccles brand of caravans for CI (Caravans International) by Sam Alper of Sprite Caravans and the relationship between Ogle and CI continued until 1975. The Eccles Amethyst was launched in 1969 at The Caravan and Camping Exhibition. Seen as ‘The Caravan of the Future’ with blown plastic exterior panels, each year the interior would be tweaked to keep the look fresh and modern. The public didn’t react favourably to these radical caravan designs and following the UK’s first customer feedback campaign in the mid-1970s, the Eccles range emerged in 1976 with a radically toned-down more traditional design which became one of the best selling caravans in Britain at that time.

Ogle Design were responsible for the widely unpopular styling of the Triumph T120 and T150 and BSA A65, A75, B50ss and other BSA motorcycles introduced in 1971. Their rectangular box shaped fuel tanks were nicknamed 'bread bins' and to help clear unsold bikes in the USA, Triumph created a 'beauty kit' which consisted of a new fuel tank and side panels which reverted to the pre-1971 more rounded teardrop style and these were often retrofitted prior to sale.

Ogle Design also created the styling of the much-derided Ariel 3 three-wheel moped which helped contribute to the demise of the British motorcycle industry.

== Karen on fastbacks ==
In March 1969, shortly after the launch of the Reliant Scimitar GTE which he had designed, and of the Ford Capri (which he did not design), Karen had the opportunity to give his opinion on fastback designs. He claimed to be "baffled" by "the case for fastbacks" because he thought there was "nothing good to be said for them except that some people think they look alright". "Aerodynamically they're lousy, headroom in the back is lousy, for visibility they're lousy, with a lot of glass they're lousy, from a weight point of view, and they give no boot access".

== Books ==
In 2010 Karen published a book, Ogle & The Bug. A second, autobiographical book, Toymaker, followed in November 2020.

== Personal life and legacy ==
Karen was divorced and lived in Cambridge. He died on 31 December 2022, at age 96.

In an interview with the BBC, ex-Apple design boss Jony Ive spoke about the positive influence that meeting Karen early in his own career had on him, and described Karen's practice as "optimistic and conspicuously responsible." He went on to say, "He perfectly embodied the ideals and values of a generation of designers that took the responsibility of their profession seriously."

== Honours ==
In 2001, Karen received an honorary degree from Loughborough University.

In 2018, Karen was appointed an OBE in the 2019 New Year Honours for his services to design.

In 2022, Letchworth Garden City Heritage Foundation staged an exhibition of Karen's works at the Museum at One Garden City, with the displays coming from the V & A, Ogle and Karen's own collection.
