= Fletcher Boats =

Fletcher Boats Ltd
- Type: Private limited company
- Industry: Boat building
- Founded: late 1950s
- Headquarters: Wolverhampton, West Midlands, England
- Website: www.fletcherboats.co.uk

Fletcher Boats Ltd, formerly Norman Fletcher Limited, is a British boatbuilding company and a former manufacturer of automobiles.

== History ==
Norman Fletcher founded the company Norman Fletcher Limited in Walsall, West Midlands, in the late 1950s and began producing boats. A small number of cars were also built, up to 1967, under the Fletcher marque. The company was sold to Hornby in the 1980s, then ran into financial difficulties in 2002. Fletcher Boats Limited was incorporated on 5 March 2003 and produces boats only. At one point Fletcher was largest producer of sports boats outside of the United States.

== Cars ==
In 1963 Norman Fletcher took over the projects of Ogle Design. Working from several prototypes, he produced a new design that still resembled the earlier Ogle SX1000. The resulting model, launched in 1967, was called the GT. It was based on the Mini and had a two-seater coupé body made of plastic. A Swiss dealer ordered 30 cars, but the order could not be filled because the British Motor Corporation did not supply the necessary parts. Four cars were built in total.
