= Ogle Design =

British design consultancy company

Ogle Noor logo

Ogle Design is a British design consultancy company founded in 1954 by David Ogle and based in Letchworth, Hertfordshire.

== History ==
- 1954 Ogle Design was founded and produced many successful designs of industrial and household products.
- 1959 The company became involved in transport design and small-scale car production.
- 1962 Ogle was killed in a car crash involving one of his SX1000 cars, Tom Karen took over as Managing Director and Chief Designer of the company, and car production ceased.
- 1974 Separate divisions were formed for product and transport design.
- 1999 Oct. Ogle Models and Prototypes sold the design business to Ogle Noor.
- 1999 Ogle Noor formed.

== Designs ==
=== Household products ===
- Bush TR82 portable radio, launched in 1959

=== Transport products ===
- The Chopper bicycle for Raleigh, launched in 1970
- For the Birmingham Small Arms-Triumph motorcycles company
  - The BSA Rocket 3
  - The Triumph Trident T150
- For the Reliant Motor Company:
  - The Scimitar GTE, launched in 1968
  - The Bond Bug, launched in 1970
  - The Robin, launched in 1973
- For Plaxton:
  - Plaxton Panorama I of 1964
  - Plaxton Panorama Elite of 1968
  - Plaxton Paramount range of coach bodies
- The Duple Dominant coach body launched in 1972
- Lucas Electric Taxi, 1975
- Modular truck cab for Shelvoke and Drewry and Dennis refuse collection vehicles and fire appliances, known as either the P-type (Shelvoke) or the Delta (Dennis) - launched in 1978.
- The Leyland Roadtrain range of Design Award winning truck cabs
  - Leyland TX450 1986 technology demonstrator truck
- For George Lucas
  - Luke Skywalker's XP-34 Landspeeder
- For the Otosan Automotive Company (Turkey)
  - The Anadol A1 (FW5) launched in 1966
- For Córas Iompair Éireann
  - Leyland Atlantean D1-D602 (1967-1974)

== Car production ==
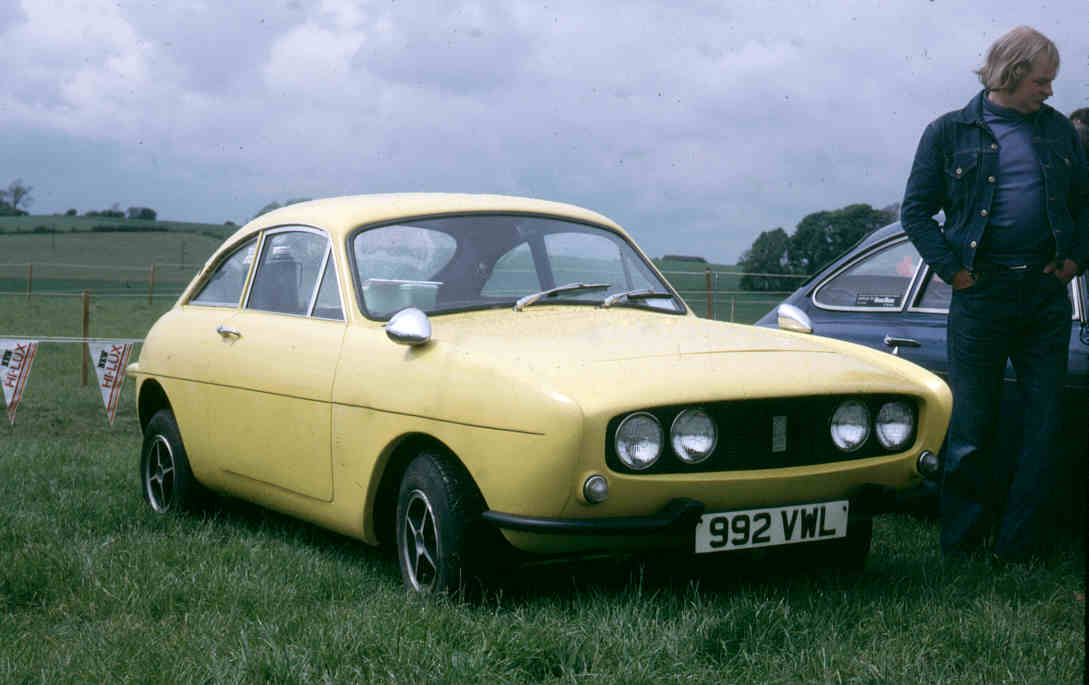
Ogle SX1000 in 1980

Between 1959 and 1962 they built a series of complete cars.

The first was the 1.5 based on an extended Riley 1.5 chassis with BMC B series 1500 cc engine. The two-door, four-seater coupé-styled body was built of glass fibre. It was capable of nearly 90 mph (140 km/h) and eight were made with a price tag of £1574.

Made in greater numbers was the 1962 SX1000 based on the Mini. The first cars were built by grafting the Ogle glass fibre body to a customer supplied Mini. The conversion cost £550 plus the customer supplied base car. Later in 1962, complete cars became available with the 997 cc Cooper version costing £1176. Any of the Mini engines could be specified up to the Mini Cooper S unit which topped out at 110 mph (180 km/h). The cars were fully equipped and featured a padded dashboard for increased safety. It is thought that 66 were made, with Jack Brabham buying one for his wife Betty for their first anniversary. Following David Ogle's death, it was decided to cease car production with the remaining parts being used up. A batch intended for the United States was converted to right-hand drive and sold onto the home market. It is thought the last one left the factory as late as 1964. The moulds were sold in 1966 to Norman Fletcher, a boat builder in West Bromwich, West Midlands, who exhibited a Fletcher GT at the 1967 Racing Car Show.

The final car was the SX250, an updated Daimler SP250 built in 1962. Two were made, but Daimler was not interested and the design was sold to Reliant where it became the basis of the Scimitar GT which was launched in 1964.

In 2012 a replica Ogle SX1000 was available from Nostalgia Cars.

== See also ==
- List of car manufacturers of the United Kingdom
