= Leyland TX450 =

British concept truck

The Leyland TX450 is a 17.5 tonne technology demonstrator concept truck developed by the British commercial vehicle company Leyland Trucks in 1986.

The aerodynamic cab design by Ogle Design incorporated a new driver layout including a mix of analogue and CRT displays, onboard computer, disc drive and printer, axle weighing system and rear view camera.

The TX450 is powered by a 165 hp Leyland 320 turbocharged engine coupled to a continuously variable transmission system. It has a 6x2 chassis layout with traction control and the trailing rear wheels steer to match the front ones, matching the manoeuvrability to that of a 7.5 tonne vehicle.
