= Landspeeder =

Fictional vehicle type from the Star Wars universe

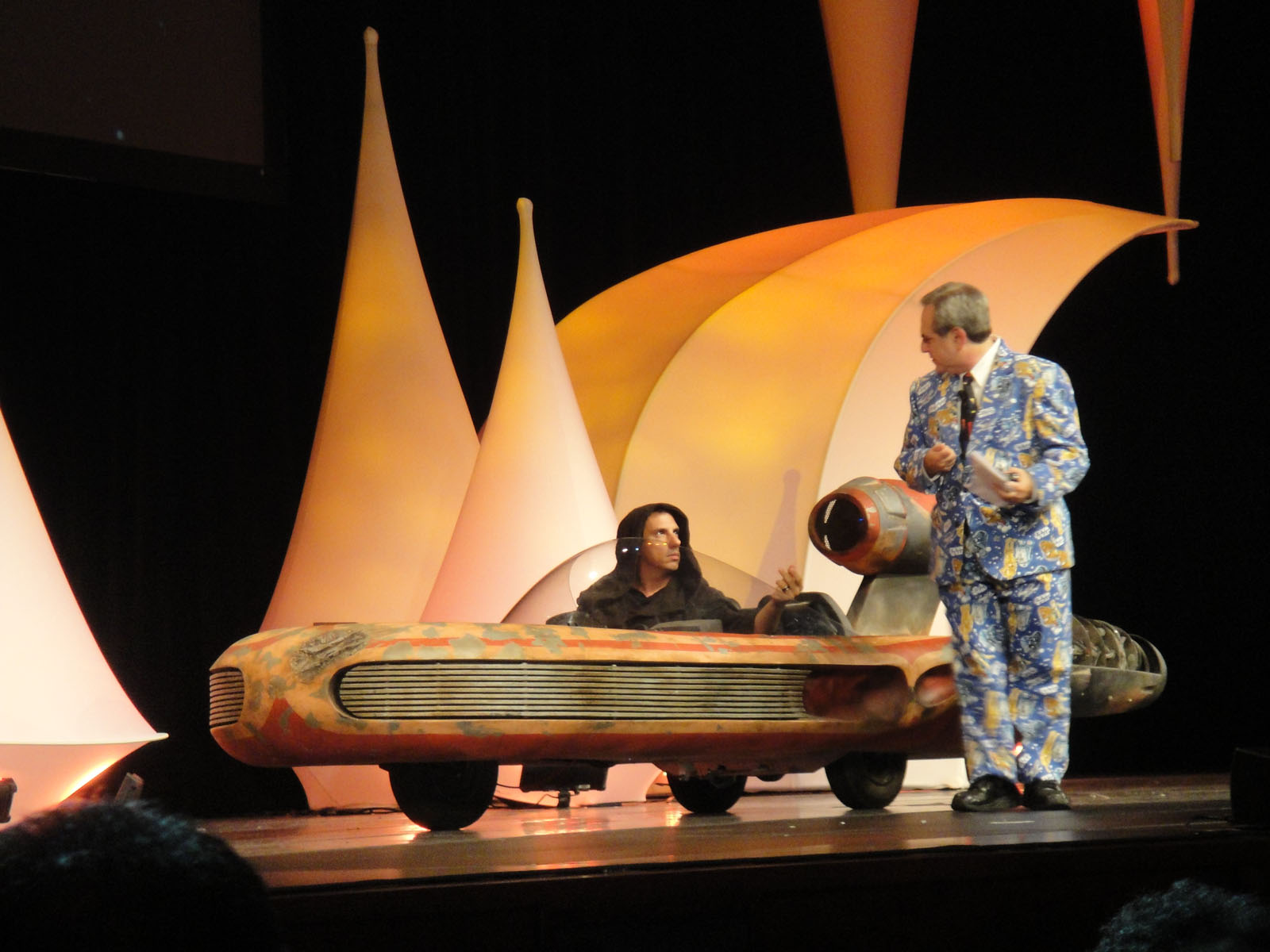
At Star Wars Celebration V

Landspeeders are fictional anti-gravity craft used through the Star Wars movies and Star Wars expanded universe. They are depicted both in civilian and military capacities, and several versions have been merchandised as toys and models.

== Origin and design ==
Landspeeders first appear in Star Wars. Two of them—Luke Skywalker's (Mark Hamill) X-34 and a V-35—were designed by noted special effects artist John Stears and were fitted around cars. Skywalker's landspeeder was designed and built by Tom Karen of Ogle Design around the chassis of a Bond Bug three-wheeler car. One of the major challenges the production crew faced was disguising the wheels to create the illusion that the craft was hovering. For certain shots, they shot from camera angles that masked the wheels; for long-distance shots, they used reflective material, gelatin on the camera lens, and shadow effects. A small blur could be seen under the speeder, which Star Wars creator George Lucas called "The Force Spot" (stated in Special Edition Tape). Production designer Roger Christian used an angled mirror and a broom attached to the vehicle's underside to create, at certain angles, the illusion that the craft was hovering and kicking up dust. Lucas used digital technology to enhance the landspeeder effects in the Special Edition of A New Hope.

Industrial Light and Magic's (ILM) Doug Chiang designed the Naboo Flash speeder with a "race car look" while the Gian speeder's appearance is ILM's response to Lucas' request that the Naboo troops have "a pick-up truck with guns."

The landspeeder was put on display in the exhibit Star Wars: Where Science Meets Imagination that moved between various museums in 2008.

== Depiction ==
Within the Star Wars universe, speeder is a generic term for any "repulsorcraft" or vehicle which uses anti-gravity repulsorlift technology to hover and fly above a planet's surface. Landspeeders more specifically use repulsor technology to hover just above the ground, while they cannot achieve any great height they are cheap and fast. Many different types of landspeeders exist in the Star Wars universe to fulfill a variety of roles, including for personal transport.

In Star Wars Film and Television

- X-34 Landspeeder: In A New Hope, Luke Skywalker (Mark Hamill) pilots an X-34 landspeeder, which he later sells before leaving Tatooine to join the Rebel Alliance. Reference material identifies the X-34 as a civilian vehicle manufactured by SoroSuub Corporation. At 3.4 m (11 ft) long, the X-34 can accommodate a pilot and passenger, while magnetic clamps behind the seating can accommodate droids or other cargo. Other features include retractable windshield which can enclose the cockpit, terrain scanner and night-vision headlights. With three turbine engines, it has a top speed of 250 km/h (160 mph) and maximum altitude of 1 m (3 ft 3 in).
- Flash Speeder: Flash speeders appear in The Phantom Menace as one of several patrol vehicles used by the Royal Naboo Security Forces. Designed for street patrol and high-speed pursuit by the SoroSuub Corporation, the Flash speeder is 4.5 m (15 ft) long with seating for a pilot and passenger and maximum altitude of 2 m (6 ft 7 in). It is armed with a single pursuit/defense blaster on a 360° swivel mount.
- Gian Speeder: Gian speeders appear in The Phantom Menace as another landspeeder used by the Royal Naboo Security Force. Unlike the Flash speeder though, reference material identifies the Gian speeder as a heavier vehicle only employed for tactical situations. Also manufactured by the SoroSuub Corporation, the Gian has a top speed of 160 km/h (99 mph). Its narrower body makes it harder to hit from the front or rear at the expense of maneuverability and its tougher hull is reinforced with armor to withstand glancing hits. Larger than the Flash speeder with a length of 5.7 m (19 ft), the Gian speeder seats a pilot, gunner and two passengers. Standard armaments include two side-mounted light repeating laser cannons, with the option of a hood-mounted heavy laser cannon. Each weapon is independently powered in the event the speeder's main generator is damaged.
- M-68 Landspeeder: The M-68 landspeeder first appears in Solo: A Star Wars Story when Han Solo (Alden Ehrenreich) and Qi'ra (Emilia Clarke) hijack one to escape the White Worms gang. Within the Star Wars universe, the M-68 is described as a popular street racing model manufactured by Mobquet Swoops and Speeders. Nicknamed the "street blaster bolt", the M-68 has a top speed of 225 km/h (140 mph) and is available in both hardtop and open-air models.
- A-A4B Truckspeeder: When Han and Qi'ra attempt to flee the White Worms gang in Solo, they are pursued by Moloch in an A-A4B Truckspeeder. Described as a heavy, rugged design, the A-A4B was built in-universe by Trast Heavy Transports with armored caging over the driver's seat and front grille, turning the landspeeder into a batter ram during high-speed chases.

== Cultural impact ==
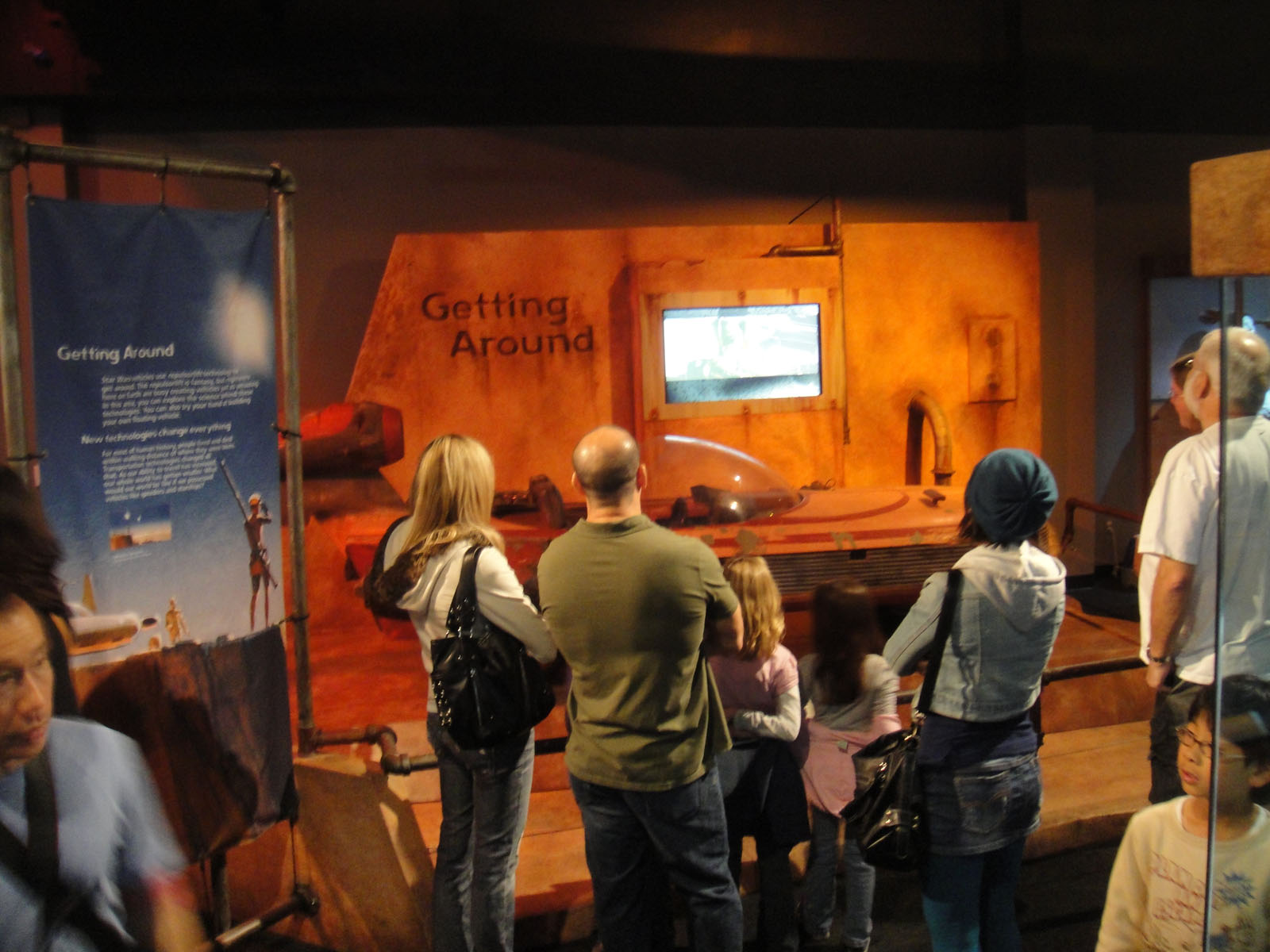
At the Discovery Science Center

Luke Skywalker's X-34 landspeeder was one of fifty fictional vehicles selected for display at the Petersen Automotive Museum's Hollywood Dream Machines exhibition which focused on the most significant or important vehicles to feature in the science fiction and fantasy genre. The X-34 was chosen not just for its role in the plot but also it's thematic contribution to the film.

Many Star Wars fans have been inspired to build "working" full-scale replicas of Luke's X-34 landspeeder. Daniel Deutsch built a drivable replica in 2007 using parts from an electric golf cart and fiberglass molding. The replica achieved fame when it was highlighted by former 'N Sync member Joey Fatone and rapper Kanye West. Celebrity YouTube inventor Colin Furze created another replica in 2019 in celebration of the release of Star Wars: The Rise of Skywalker. The only known full-scale metal model of the X-34, it was sold on eBay for £50,000, with all proceeds going to BBC’s ‘Children In Need’.

Landspeeders have served as a source of inspiration for Star Wars fans across artistic communities. Digital artist Brad Builds created a landspeeder version of the Pontiac GTO themed around Darth Vader. French photographer Renaud Marion reimagined 9 classic cars as landspeeders as part of a project called Air Cars. Reimagined models included the Porsche 356 and Aston Martin DB5.

Although they operate on different principles, flying cars are often compared to Star Wars landspeeders in popular media. The SkyDrive SD-03 flying car specifically was inspired in part by Luke Skywalker's landspeeder.

Landspeeders have featured heavily in Star Wars merchandising since their inception. Examples includes Lego models, a drivable Radio Flyer toy, and a cat bed. It has also appeared in numerous Star Wars videos games, including Super Star Wars and the Lego Star Wars video game series.

== Bibliography ==
- Barr, Patricia; Bray, Adam; Jones, Matt; Horton, Cole; Wallace, Daniel; Windham, Ryder (2019). Ultimate Star Wars New Edition. United States: DK Publishing. ISBN 978-1-4654-7900-6.
- Dougherty, Kerrie; Fry, Jason; Hidalgo, Pablo; Reynolds, David West; Saxton, Curtis; Windham, Ryder (2020). Star Wars Complete Vehicles New Edition. United States: DK Publishing. ISBN 978-0-7440-2057-1.
- Walker, Landry Q. (2018). Star Wars Encyclopedia of Starfighters and Other Vehicles. United States: DK Publishing. ISBN 9781465482716.
