= Lucas Electric Taxi =

Overview
- Manufacturer: Lucas Industries
- Production: 2 prototypes
- Model years: 1975
- Designer: Ogle Design

Body and chassis
- Body style: 4-door saloon
- Layout: front-wheel-drive

Powertrain
- Battery: Lead–acid battery
- Electric range: 100 miles

Dimensions
- Wheelbase: 2,390 mm (94.1 in)
- Length: 3,570 mm (140.6 in)
- Width: 1,770 mm (69.7 in)
- Height: 1,780 mm (70.1 in)
- Kerb weight: 2,250 kg (4,960 lb)

The Lucas Electric Taxi is a prototype electric vehicle first shown to the public last the British Motor Show in 1975.

== Overview ==
Developed by British electronics company Lucas and Ogle Design, the battery-powered car featured a 50 bhp 216 volt motor and incorporated regenerative braking. The lead acid battery pack is designed for charging in situ or by exchanging for a ready-charged set.

The Electric Taxi is front wheel drive and has a claimed range of 100 miles (160.9 km) and a top speed of 50 mph (80.5 km/h).

The two prototypes were registered and undertook various trials, including a speed trial at the British Grand Prix on 18 July 1976. One of the prototypes was put on display at the National Motor Museum, Beaulieu in 1979 and was then relocated to the British Motor Museum in 1987. It was then sold to a private collector. Lucas retained the other prototype but it was destroyed in a fire.

From 1977 Lucas continued to develop its electric vehicle technology in the Bedford CF electric van.
