= Reliant Scimitar =

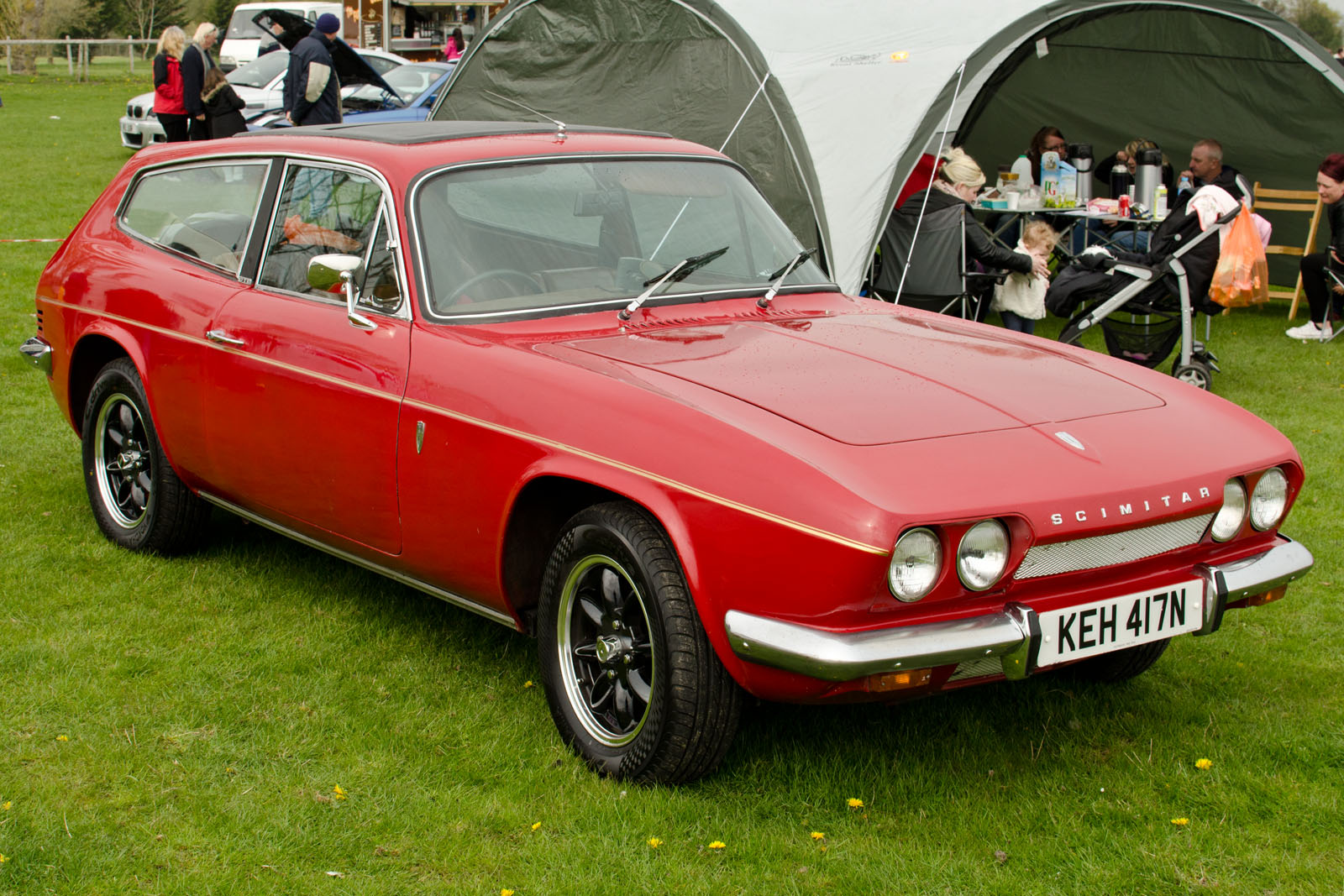
- 1975 Reliant Scimitar GTE (SE5A)

Overview
- Manufacturer: Reliant
- Production: 1964–1986
- Assembly: United Kingdom: Tamworth, England

Body and chassis
- Class: Sports car
- Body style: Coupé, shooting brake, cabriolet
- Layout: Front-engine, rear-wheel-drive

Chronology
- Predecessor: Ogle SX250
- Successor: Reliant Scimitar SS1

The Reliant Scimitar name was used for a series of sports car models produced by British car manufacturer Reliant between 1964 and 1986. During its 22-year production it evolved from a coupe (GT) into a sports estate (GTE), with a convertible variant (GTC) launched in 1980. All have a fibreglass body mounted on a steel box-section chassis, and Ford engines.

== Scimitar GT SE4 (1964–1970) ==
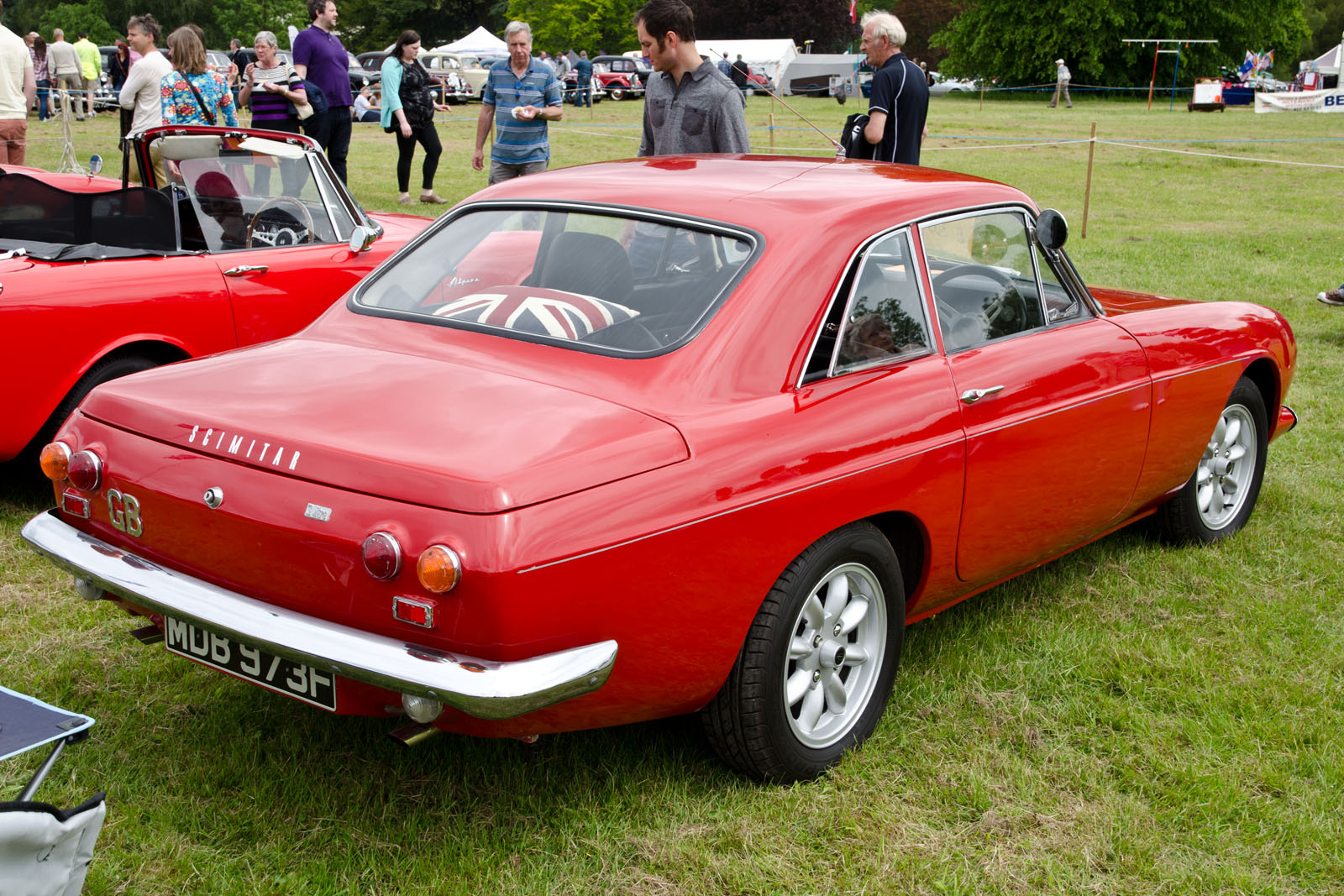
Rear

Reliant Scimitar GT (SE4)
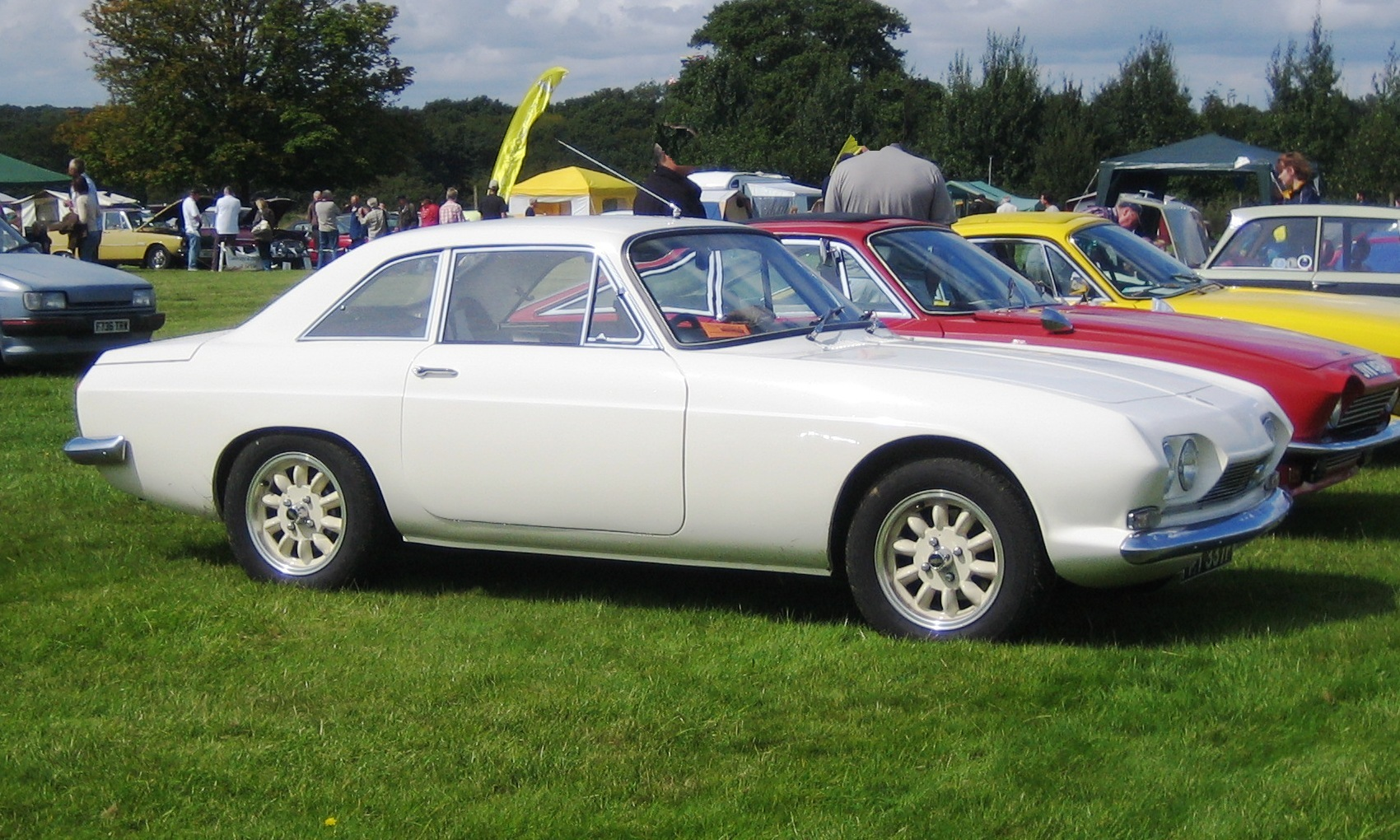

Overview
- Production: 1964–1970
- Designer: Ogle Design

Body and chassis
- Body style: 2-door coupé

Powertrain
- Engine: 2,553 cc Ford Zephyr 6 I6 (1964–1966); 2,495 cc Ford Essex V6 (1967–1970); 2,994 cc Ford Essex V6 (1966–1970)
- Transmission: 4-speed manual

Dimensions
- Wheelbase: 92 in (2,337 mm)
- Length: 167.5 in (4,254 mm)
- Width: 62 in (1,575 mm)
- Height: 51 in (1,295 mm)
- Kerb weight: 2,380 lb (1,080 kg)

Chronology
- Successor: Reliant Scimitar GTE (SE5)

Reliant's first Scimitar was a coupé based upon the styling of a Daimler SP250 prototype (renamed the SX250) and the chassis of a Reliant Sabre. It was first displayed in 1964. It was powered by a 2.6-litre Ford straight six from the Ford Zephyr and Zodiac. In order to keep cost down, many components in addition to the engine were existing ones originally designed for competitor models, a point emphasized for buyers of the early Scimitars in which unfolding the sun visor involved knocking the rearview mirror out of adjustment.

In 1966 the SE4A was replaced by the SE4B, with a 3.0 L V6 Ford "Essex" engine. A year later, in September 1967, the cheaper SE4C was introduced with a 2.5-litre version of the same engine and a reduction of £105 on the recommended retail price. The engine differed from the one fitted on the Ford Zephyr 6 in that the Reliant engine came with an alternator whereas Ford buyers had to be content with a dynamo.

Just over 1000 SE4s were produced.

=== 1964: Scimitar GT SE4 ===
Scimitar Coupe with 2.6-litre straight six engine

As the Sabre 6 began looking a bit dated, managing director Ray Wiggin started looking for a new design. While at the 1962 Motor Show, he saw a car called an Ogle SX250: it had been designed by David Ogle (of David Ogle Associates, later known as Ogle Design) and it was based on the Daimler Dart SP250 chassis and running gear. The car had been privately commissioned by Boris Forter, managing director of the Helena Rubenstein Company (UK), who later had another one built for his girlfriend.

Daimler didn't use the design, so Reliant approached Ogle and asked to buy the rights for it. Some subtle changes were made to the bodyshell and it was further modified to fit the Reliant Sabre chassis and running gear.

The new Scimitar GT car retained the straight-six engine from the Sabre, but with triple SU carburettors as standard it now produced 120 bhp and propelled the car to a top speed of 117 mph (188 km/h). It was launched at the Earls Court Motor Show in 1964; it was praised for its elegant lines and performance figures for a price of £1,292. The price included wire wheels and a luxurious interior with comprehensive instrumentation. Optional extras included a choice of De Normanville overdrive unit, electric sunroof and ZF gearbox. Reliant produced approximately 296 straight-six Scimitar GTs.

=== 1966: Scimitar GT SE4A/B ===
Scimitar coupé with 3-litre V6 Essex engine (approximately 591 built)

In late 1966 Ford dropped the 2.6-litre Straight Six engine and replaced it with the new 3-litre Essex V6 engine (as used in the latest MK IV Ford Zodiac). This meant that Reliant had to do a good deal of development work to the existing Scimitar GT to enable the new more powerful engine to fit and obtain best performance and handling.

As the Essex engine was shorter, it was mounted further back in the bulkhead to help improve weight distribution. The lower wishbones were re-positioned, the tower structures and cross members were reinforced and an anti-roll bar was fitted. Other modifications included replacing the wire wheels with wider steel wheels as standard, and the fitting of a higher-ratio rear axle (3.58:1 instead of 3.875:1).

The interior was updated to move with the times. There was now an all-anti-dazzle-black interior (including black instrument dial bezels instead of the previous chrome versions). The padded fascia board had crash pads at the top and bottom, and improvements were made with the ventilation by fitting directionally variable ventilator jets, as used by Ford.

This is what Autocar said about the new 3-litre Scimitar GT on 12 January 1967:

"At a Glance – High performance 2+2 coupe. Lusty, low revving engine in conjunction with high gearing gives effortless cruising at three-figure speeds. Good gear change, but rather wide ratios. Smooth, light clutch. Ride and handling very good, and much improved over the earlier car. Light, accurate steering and first class brakes with powerful servo. Ventilation improved but still not ideal. Fuel and range very good".

=== 1967: Scimitar GT SE4C ===
Scimitar coupé with 2.5-litre V6 Essex engine (118 built)

Reliant introduced their third and final version of the V6 Scimitar GT in late 1967. To widen its appeal they launched a slightly less powerful Scimitar GT.

Using Ford's 2.5-litre version of the V6 Essex engine meant that the car could still reach speeds of over 110 mph (177 km/h), have slightly better fuel economy, but ultimately reduce the cost to the public by approx £120. Externally, the only difference between the 3-litre and 2.5-litre versions was the small badge on the boot giving the engine size. Approximately 118 of the 2.5-litre Scimitar GTs were sold before this version was withdrawn. Production of the standard Scimitar GT continued until November 1970.

== Scimitar GTE SE5 (1968–1972) and SE5A (1972–1975) ==
Reliant Scimitar GTE (SE5/SE5A)
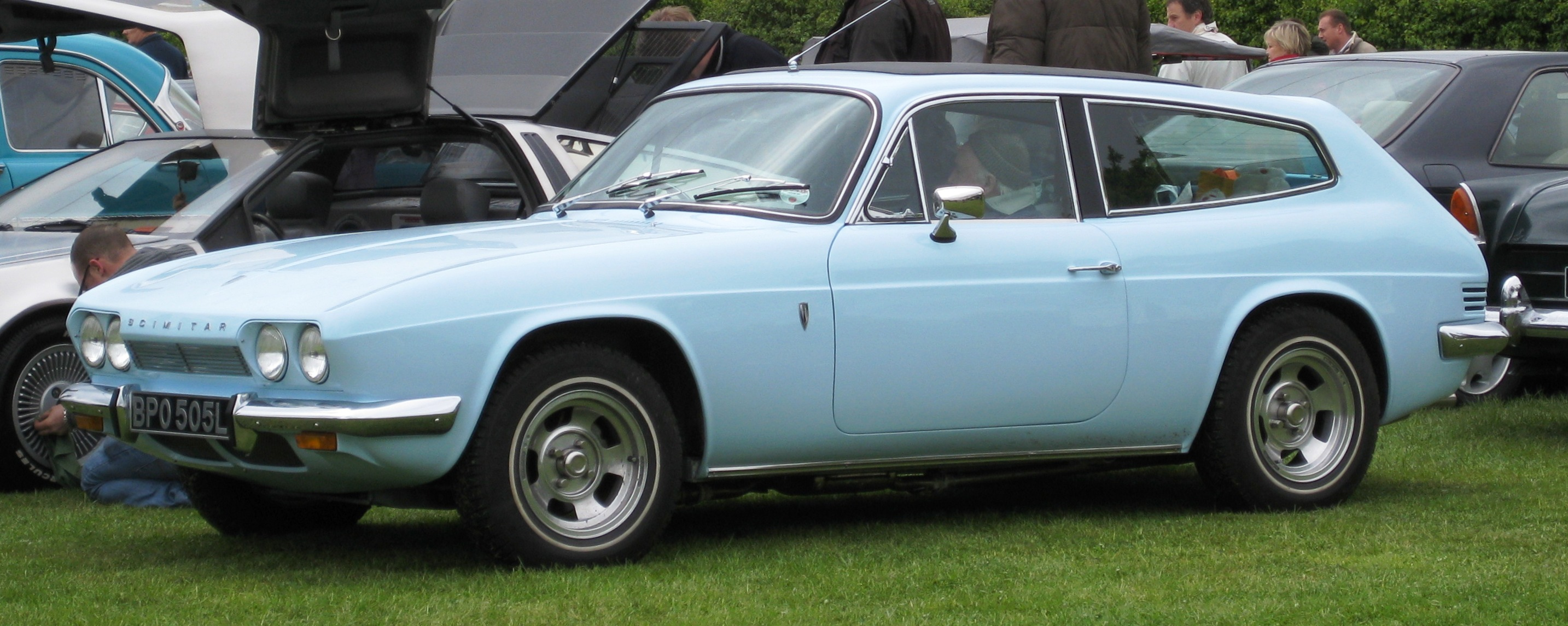

Overview
- Production: 1968–1975
- Designer: Tom Karen of Ogle Design

Body and chassis
- Body style: 2-door shooting brake

Powertrain
- Engine: 2,994 cc Ford Essex V6
- Transmission: 4-speed manual 3-speed Borg Warner 35 automatic

Dimensions
- Wheelbase: 99.5 in (2,527 mm)
- Length: 171 in (4,343 mm)
- Width: 64.5 in (1,638 mm)
- Height: 52 in (1,321 mm)
- Kerb weight: 2,620 lb (1,188 kg)

Chronology
- Predecessor: Reliant Scimitar GT (SE4)
- Successor: Reliant Scimitar GTE (SE6)

Tom Karen of Ogle was asked to submit some body designs based on the Ogle Design GTS estate car experiment for a new four-seater Scimitar, the SE5 Reliant Scimitar. Managing Director Ray Wiggin, Chief Engineer John Crosthwaite and fibreglass body expert Ken Wood went to Ogle's in Letchworth to view some mock-up body designs for the new SE5. Wiggin told Wood to proceed with a proper master.

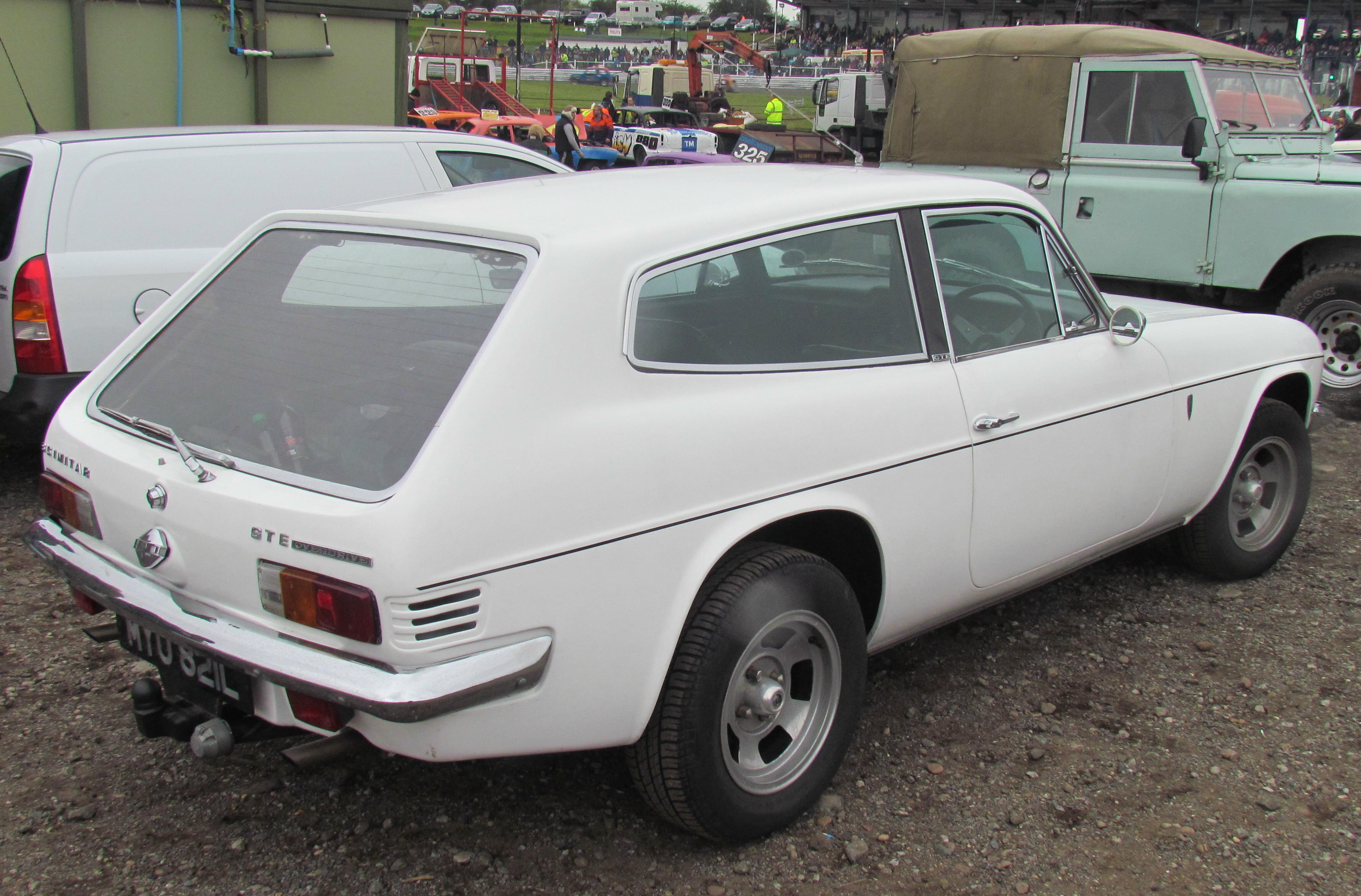
Rear

The SE5 was conceived and ready for the 1968 Motor Show in less than 12 months. For the SE5 John Crosthwaite and his team designed a completely different longer chassis frame, revised suspension, new and relocated fuel tank, a rollover bar, new cooling system, spare wheel mounted in the nose to give increased rear space and a 17 1/4 imperial gallons (78 L) fuel tank. When designing the chassis Crosthwaite worked closely with Ogle body stylist Peter Bailey to modify and refine the prototype.

The main change introduced in the SE5 was the sports estate hatchback body shape, although other car manufacturers had also produced hatchback models.

The SE5 came with the same 3.0-litre Ford Essex engine used in the SE4a/b. This gave the SE5 a claimed top speed of over 120 mph (193 km/h). A Borg-Warner 35 automatic transmission was added as an option in 1970 and by 1971, overdrive on the 4-speed manual was offered. In 1972 several improvements were included in the upgrade to SE5A, including a boost in power. The extra 7 hp (5 kW) and maximum engine speed raised performance and the GTE was now capable of 0–60 mph (0–97 km/h) in 8.5 seconds and top speed was raised to 121 mph (195 km/h). The SE5's flat dashboard also gave way to a curved and moulded plastic one. The SE5A can be recognised from a SE5 at the rear by the reverse lamps which are below the bumper on the earlier model and are incorporated into the rear clusters on the later version (these were also carried over onto the SE6 and later). Badging changes included changing the "SCIMITAR" lettering from a narrow type-style to a fatter one.

Directly following the announcement of the car, Autocar magazine tested a 3-litre GTE (with manual transmission) in October 1968. They reported a maximum speed of 117 mph (188 km/h) and a 0–60 mph (0–97 km/h) time of 10.7 seconds. Overall fuel consumption for the test came in at 18.5 mpg. The manufacturer's UK market recommended retail price, including sales taxes, was £1,759. The 3-litre MG MGC GT was retailing at this time for £1,337 while Rover's 3500 was offered for £1,791. Launch of the more directly comparable Volvo 1800ES was still four years away.

4,311 SE5s were produced. It was an instant success; GT production was cut down and the proportion of GTEs to GTs being built was four-to-one. Reliant increased its volume by 20% in the first year. The 5A model sold more than any other Scimitar, with 5105 manufactured. Princess Anne was given a manual overdrive SE5 as a joint 20th birthday present and Christmas present in November 1970 by the Queen and the Duke of Edinburgh. It was Air Force blue in colour with a grey leather interior and registered 1420 H in recognition of her position as Colonel-in-Chief of the 14th/20th Hussars. Anne subsequently owned eight other GTEs.

== Scimitar GTE SE6 (1975–1976), SE6A (1976–1980) and SE6B (1980–1986) ==
Reliant Scimitar GTE (SE6/SE6A/SE6B)
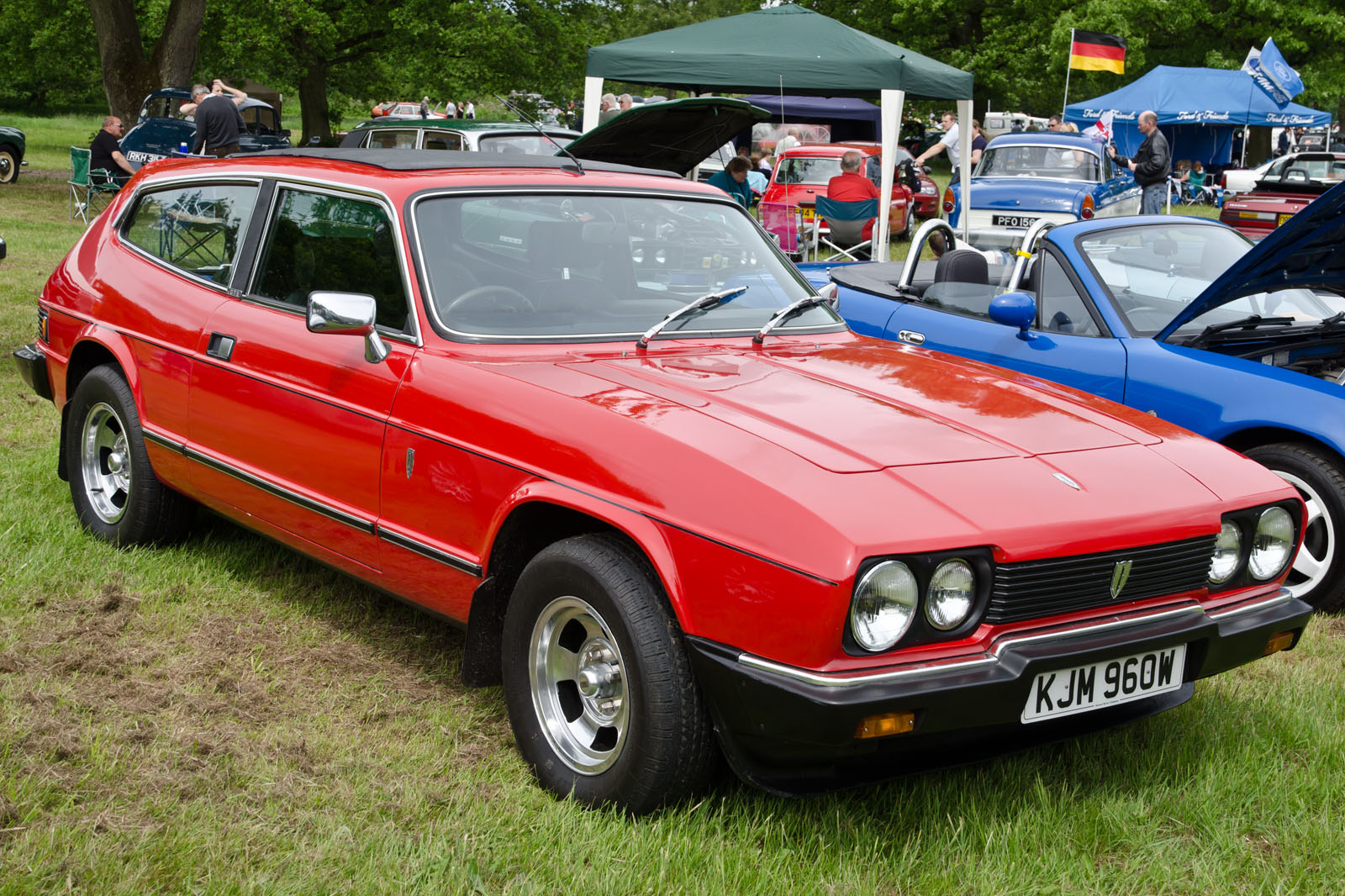

Overview
- Production: 1975–1986

Body and chassis
- Body style: 2-door shooting brake

Powertrain
- Engine: 2,994 cc Ford Essex V6 (1975–1980); 2,792 cc Ford Cologne V6 (1980–1986)
- Transmission: 4-speed manual (overdrive optional); 3-speed Borg Warner 35 automatic (SE6); 3-speed Ford C3 automatic (SE6A on)

Dimensions
- Wheelbase: 103.81 in (2,637 mm)
- Length: 174.5 in (4,432 mm)
- Width: 67.25 in (1,708 mm)
- Height: 52 in (1,321 mm)
- Kerb weight: 2,762 lb (1,253 kg) (automatic transmission)

Chronology
- Predecessor: Reliant Scimitar GTE (SE5)
- Successor: Middlebridge Scimitar

More of a luxury model than the SE5, the SE6 series was promoted to the executive market. These models were two-door sports estates, again with the Ford V6 3.0 L engine as used in the SE5A with 135 bhp,: the wheelbase was increased by 4 inches (10 cm) and the track by 3 inches (8 cm) making the cars correspondingly longer and wider than their predecessors. The extra length was used to improve rear-seat legroom and access which enhanced the car's credentials as a 'genuine' four-seater. Noticeable changes from the earlier models were the increase in the outer headlamp size from 5.3/4" to 7" and the replacement of the chrome plated bumpers with rubber ones. A Laycock overdrive on third and fourth gear was optional. The SE6 was replaced by the SE6A in late 1976. 543 SE6 models were produced.

The SE6A displayed a number of changes, including Lockheed brakes and suspension revisions. An easy way to spot a SE6A from a SE6 is the change to orange from red reflectors on the rear extractor vents, and the three vertical grooves in the front bumper (in front of the wheel arches) were removed. 3877 SE6As were made—making it the most popular version of all the SE6 shape.

Ford had stopped making the Essex engine for the Capri by 1981, and production stopped completely in 1988 so one of the major differences with the SE6B was the engine. The German-built Ford Cologne 2.8 L V6 was used instead (thus the chassis on the 6B differs from the 6/6A at the front) and provided similar power, but rather less torque at low revs. The final drive ratio was lowered from 3.31:1 to 3.54:1 to compensate. When tested by Autocar in 1981, a Scimitar GTE with the 2.8 L engine and automatic transmission achieved a 0–60 mph (97 km/h) time of 10.8 seconds and a top speed of 116 mph (187 km/h). All SE6Bs (and the SE8) were equipped with the quite troublesome Pierburg/Solex carburetted engines (many owners have changed to the Weber 38DGAS from the Essex engine) and although the battery was moved from the SE6/SE6A position to allow for injection equipment to be fitted, none ever left the factory so fitted. Some late versions (around 1983 on) came with the galvanised chassis as standard but the exact numbers and chassis details are vague.

Introduced at the 1980 Geneva Motor Show, only 407 SE6Bs were manufactured. Production ceased by 1986.

== Scimitar GTC SE8 (1980–1986) ==
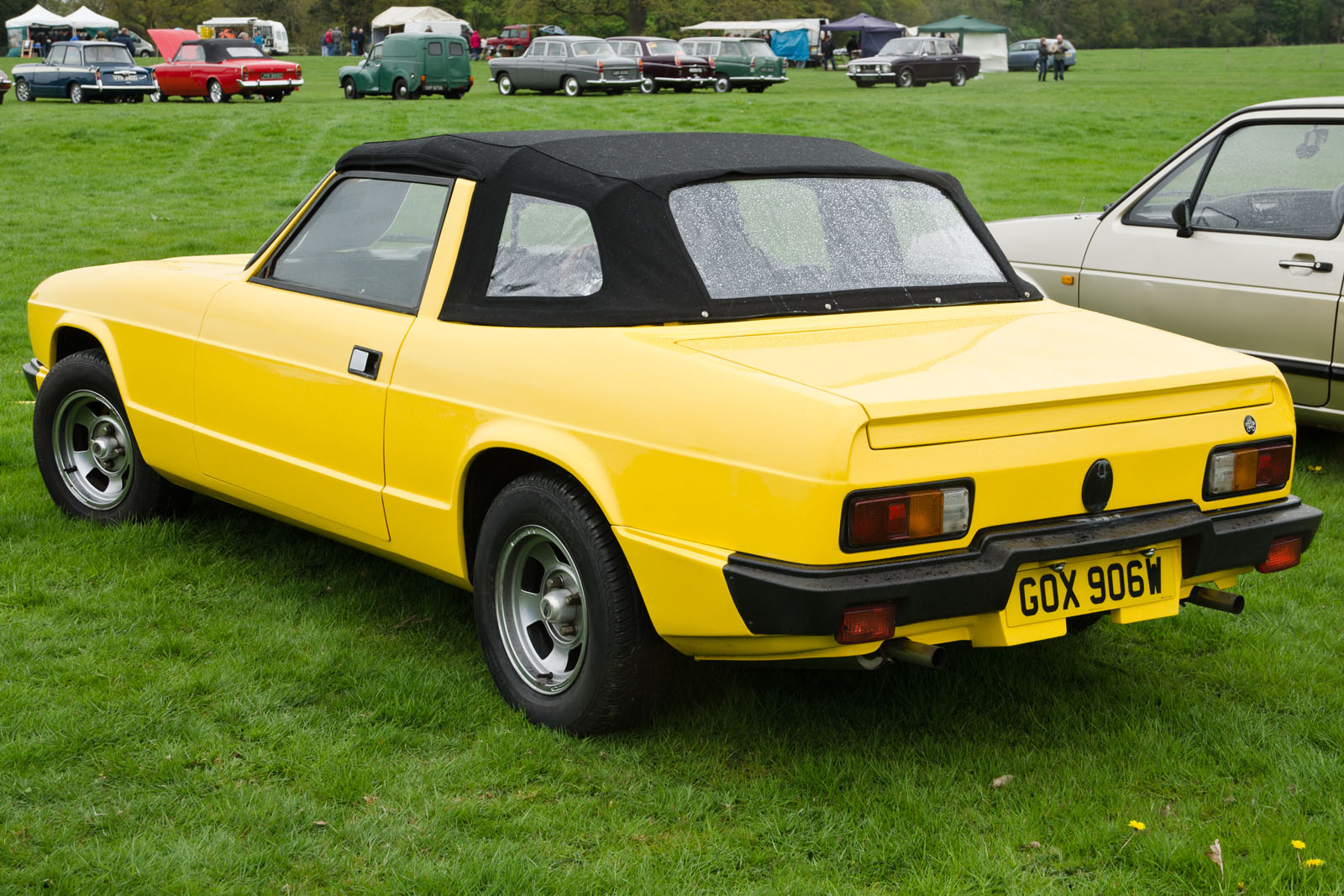
Rear

Reliant Scimitar GTC
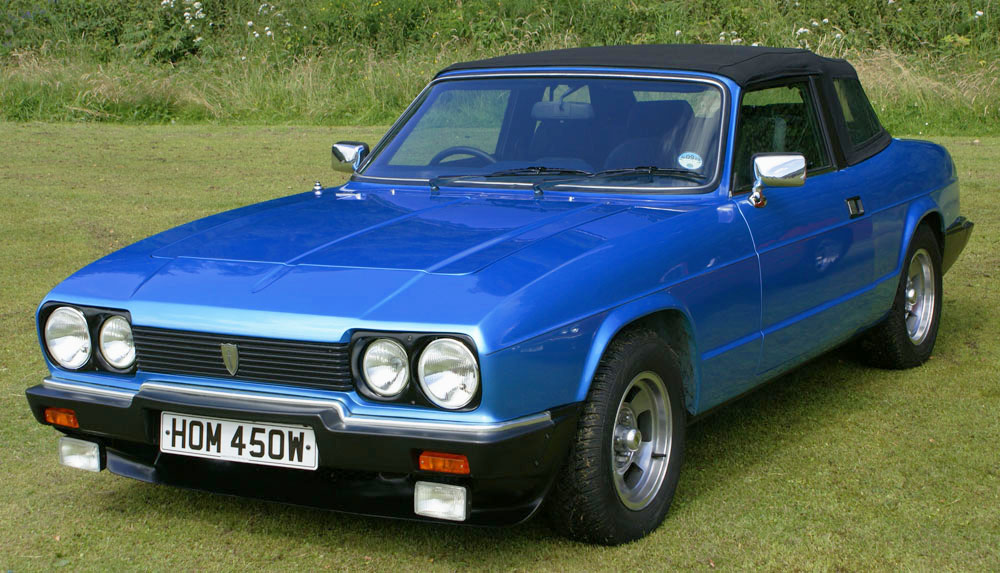

Overview
- Production: 1980–1986; 442 built

Powertrain
- Engine: 2,792 cc Ford Cologne V6
- Transmission: 4-speed manual with overdrive 3-speed Ford C3 automatic

Dimensions
- Wheelbase: 2,637 mm (103.8 in)
- Length: 4,432 mm (174.5 in)
- Width: 1,720 mm (67.7 in)
- Height: 1,321 mm (52.0 in)
- Kerb weight: 2,790 lb (1,266 kg)

Reliant began planning a convertible in 1977 and commissioned Ogle Design to create a proposal. Tom Karen adapted his earlier GTE design and created a four-seater convertible with a good-sized boot. From the B-post back, all of the panels were new, with extra bracing introduced between the rear side panels and door hinge plates running under the dashboard. The roll hoop from the GTE was retained, and for additional support this was linked to extra tubes running around the front screen creating a Triumph Stag-like T-bar design that would ensure the rigidity of the new body design. As the car sported a separate chassis and the extra bracing, it did not suffer from the scuttle shake that unibody convertibles could be prone to suffer. The hood was designed in house by adapting the hood frame from a Triumph Stag, with a bespoke cover made of mohair. A prototype car was produced in 1978 and was powered by a 3.0 Essex engine. Later Reliant replaced it with a 2.8 Cologne engine, because Ford had withdrawn its Essex engines from the European market in favour of the Cologne unit. This was slightly down on torque compared to the Essex engine, so to improve performance Reliant changed the final drive ratio from 3.31 to 3.54. The GTC was launched in March 1980, with a hardtop added after the Birmingham Motor Show that year. While it was well received by the motoring press, in 1980 the country was heading into a recession and Reliant struggled to sell its £11,360 convertibles in great numbers. As a result, many cars were left sitting at the factory for months until owners could be found. By 1986 the Scimitar GTC cost 20% more than a Ford Escort XR3i Cabriolet, a similar offering in respect of seats and performance.

- A total of 442 production GTCs were manufactured by Reliant (+ 1 prototype)
- 340 were manufactured in 1980 (the first year of production)
- Factory galvanised chassis from production number 372 – 442 (earlier cars had a painted steel chassis)
- 3 were manufactured in 1981, 20 in 1982, 24 in 1983, 29 in 1984, 13 in 1985, 13 in 1986
- Most of the cars registered in 1981 were actually manufactured in 1980
- The GTC is lighter than the SE6B GTE on which it is based
- The GTC was 10% more expensive than the SE6B in 1980
- In 1980 a GTC would have cost £11,360, equivalent to more than £40,000 now
