= David Ogle =

British industrial and car designer (1921–1962)

David Ogle MBE DSC

Personal details
- Born: David Slingsby Ogle; 1921
- Died: 25 May 1962 (aged 40–41) Digswell Hill, Welwyn, Hertfordshire, England

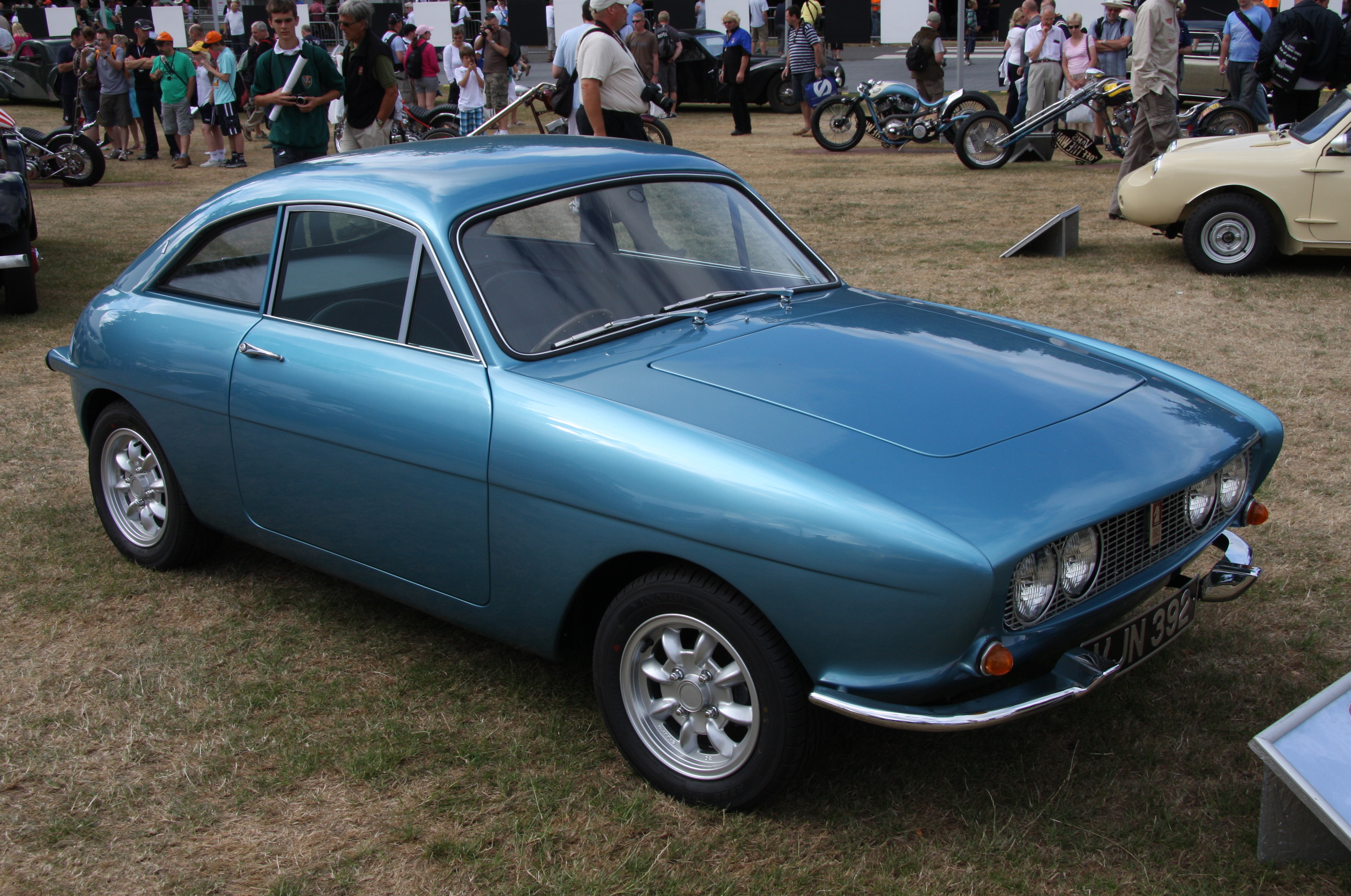
1962 Ogle SX1000

David Slingsby Ogle (1921 – 25 May 1962) was a British industrial and car designer. He founded the design consultancy company Ogle Design in 1954.

He was educated at Rugby School and briefly studied law at University of Oxford. In 1940 he joined the Fleet Air Arm. He flew the Supermarine Seafire in operations in North Africa, the Mediterranean, and in the south of France. He rose to the rank of Lt Commander and was awarded the DSC and the MBE.

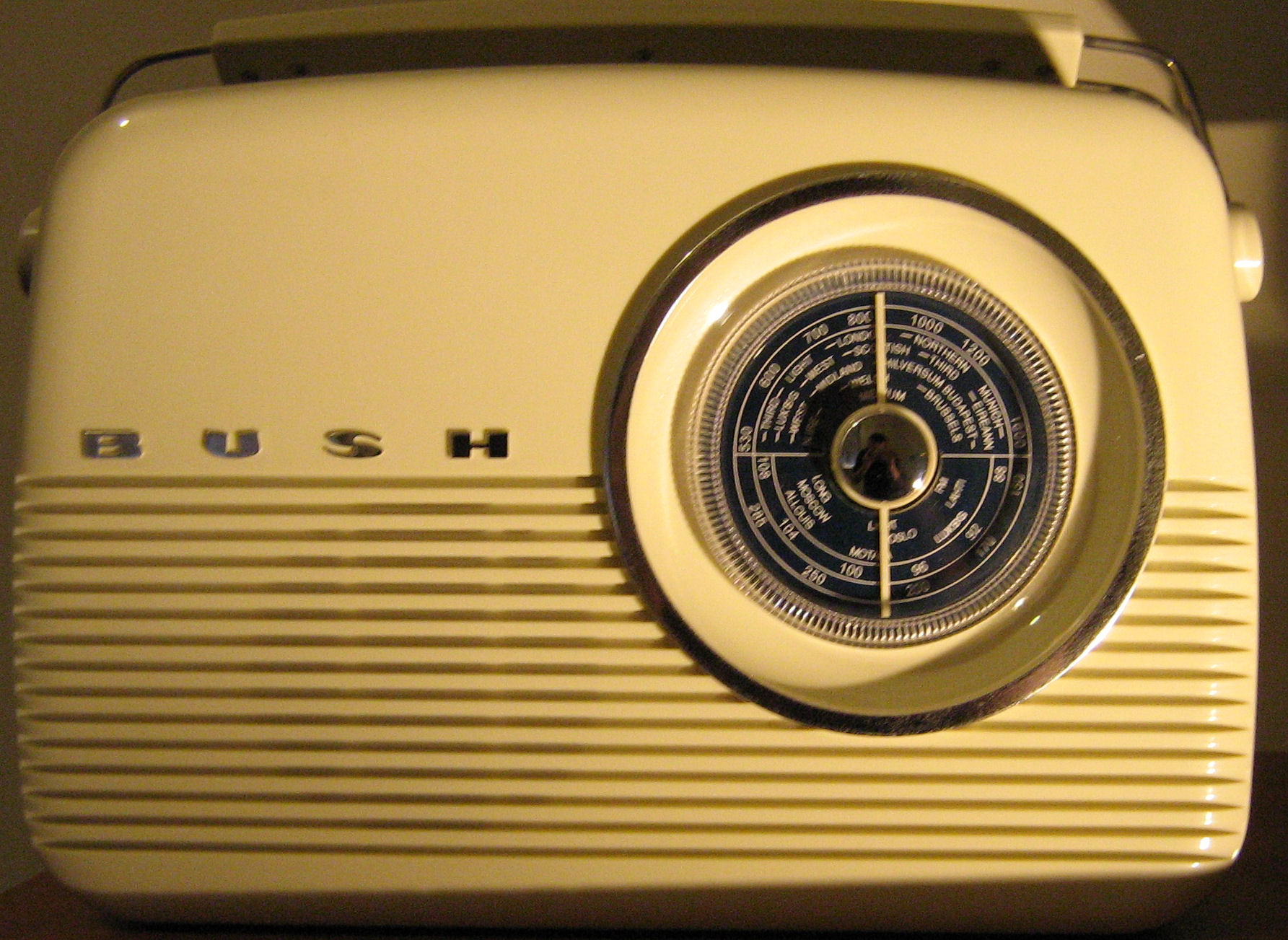
Reproduction TR82 radio

At the conclusion of the war he attended the Central School of Art and Design in London, studying industrial design. He subsequently joined Murphy Radio. He left Murphy in 1948 to join Bush Radio. It was while at Bush that he was responsible for the iconic design of the TR82 transistor radio.

He went on to design the Ogle SX1000 based on the Mini. Sixty-nine cars were made before David Ogle's death. He also designed the Reliant Scimitar and the controversial Triumph 750 Trident T150 motorcycle.

Ogle died in an automobile accident on 25 May 1962, while driving an Ogle Mini GT sports car on the way to Brands Hatch race circuit where he was going to demonstrate the vehicle. He was on the A1 highway at Digswell Hill, Welwyn, Hertfordshire and travelling at 85 miles per hour (137 km/h) when he collided with a van and the car burst into flames.

== Honours and awards ==
- 27 March 1945 – For distinguished service and gallantry during the invasion of the South of France, the Distinguished Service Cross (DSC) to Temporary Lieutenant (A) David Slingsby Ogle, RNVR (Reigate).
- 13 June 1946 – To be a Member of the Order of the British Empire – Lieutenant (A) Davide Slingsby Ogle, DSC, RNVR.
