= Daimler SP250 =

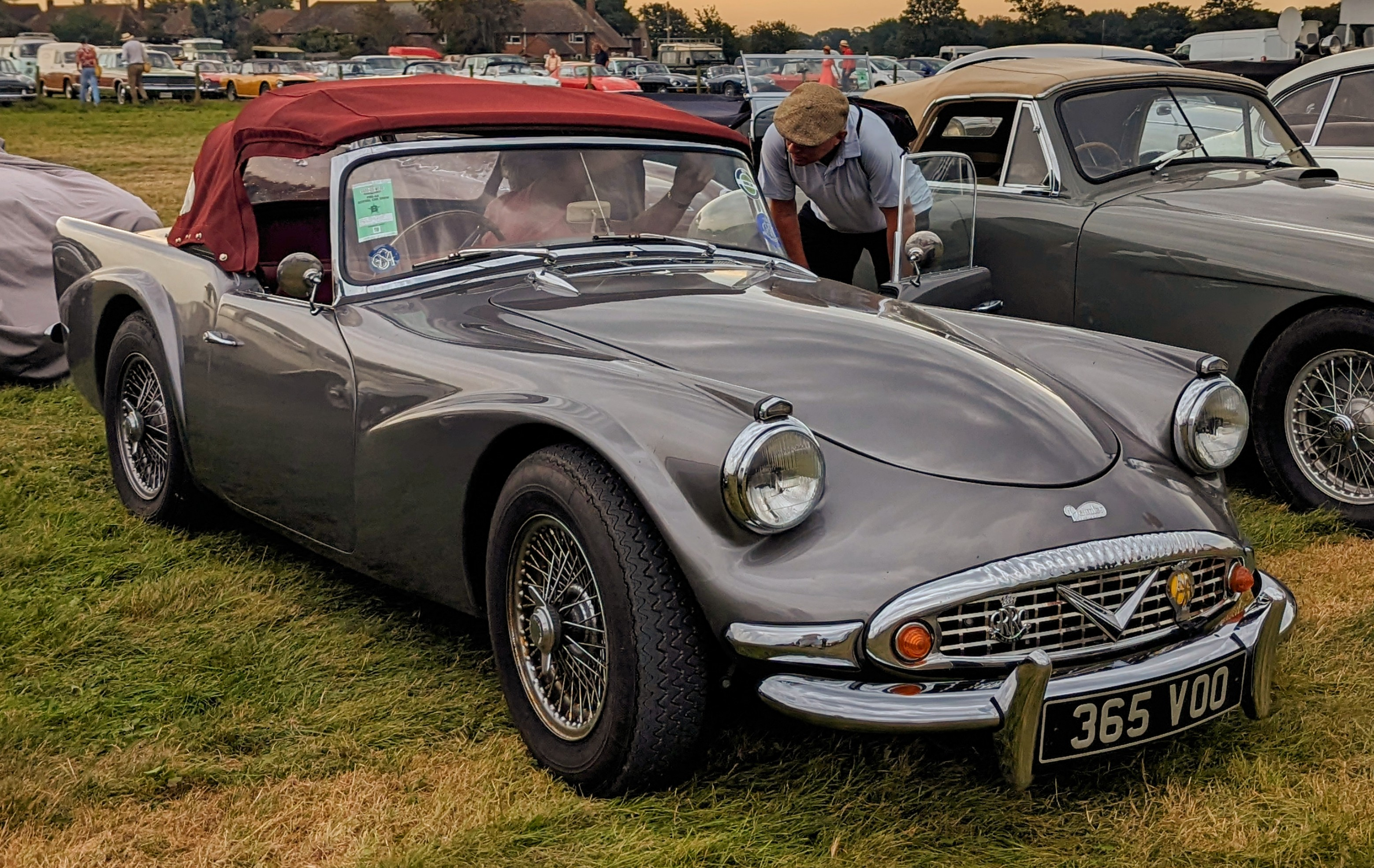
- 1963 Daimler SP250

Overview
- Manufacturer: The Daimler Company Limited
- Also called: Daimler Dart (pre-production)
- Production: 1959–1964
- Assembly: United Kingdom: Coventry
- Designer: Edward Turner; Jack Wickes

Body and chassis
- Class: Sports car
- Body style: 2-seat open car
- Layout: FR layout

Powertrain
- Engine: 2.5 litre iron-block V-8 140 hp (104 kW)
- Transmission: 4-speed manual; 3-speed automatic

Dimensions
- Wheelbase: 92 in (2,337 mm)
- Length: 165 in (4,191 mm)
- Width: 60 in (1,524 mm)
- Height: 50.25 in (1,276 mm)
- Kerb weight: 2,070 lb (940 kg)

The Daimler SP250 is a sports car built by the Daimler Company, a British manufacturer in Coventry, from 1959 to 1964. It was the last car to be launched by Daimler before its parent company, the Birmingham Small Arms Company (BSA), sold it to Jaguar Cars in 1960.

== Concept, design, and engineering ==
Shortly after being appointed managing director (chief executive) of BSA's Automotive Division in 1956, Edward Turner was asked to design a saloon car powered by a V8 engine. The engine drawings were finalised by March 1958, but the saloon prototype, project number DN250, was not available for examination by the committee formed in 1958 to report on the feasibility of the V8 cars. The committee's evaluation centred on the prototypes being tested at the time, which were for the SP250 sports car project.

According to the feasibility study conducted by the committee, the SP250 would generate a profit of more than £700,000 based on a projection of 1,500 cars being sold in the first year of production and 3,000 cars per year for the second and third years of production. Two-thirds of the sales of the car were expected to be in the United States. The study also determined that the body should be made from fibreglass, with shorter time to the beginning of production, tooling costs of £16,000 as opposed to £120,000 for steel bodies, and lower cost to change the styling.

The original version, later called the "A-spec", could reach a speed of 120 mph (193 km/h), but the chassis, a "14-gauge ladder frame with cruciform bracing" based on the Triumph TR3, flexed so much that doors occasionally came open, marring its reputation. Bumpers were originally an optional extra. With the basic specification not including full bumpers, the A-spec cars have two short, chromium-plated "whiskers" on the body on either side of the front grille and two short, vertical bumpers, or "overriders" at the rear, which were not included if the rear bumper was optioned. Early A-spec. cars had recesses behind the door handles, but these were phased out.

The manual gearbox, the first of the type used by Daimler since they started using the preselector type across their range in the 1930s, was reverse engineered from the Standard gearbox used in the Triumph TR3A.

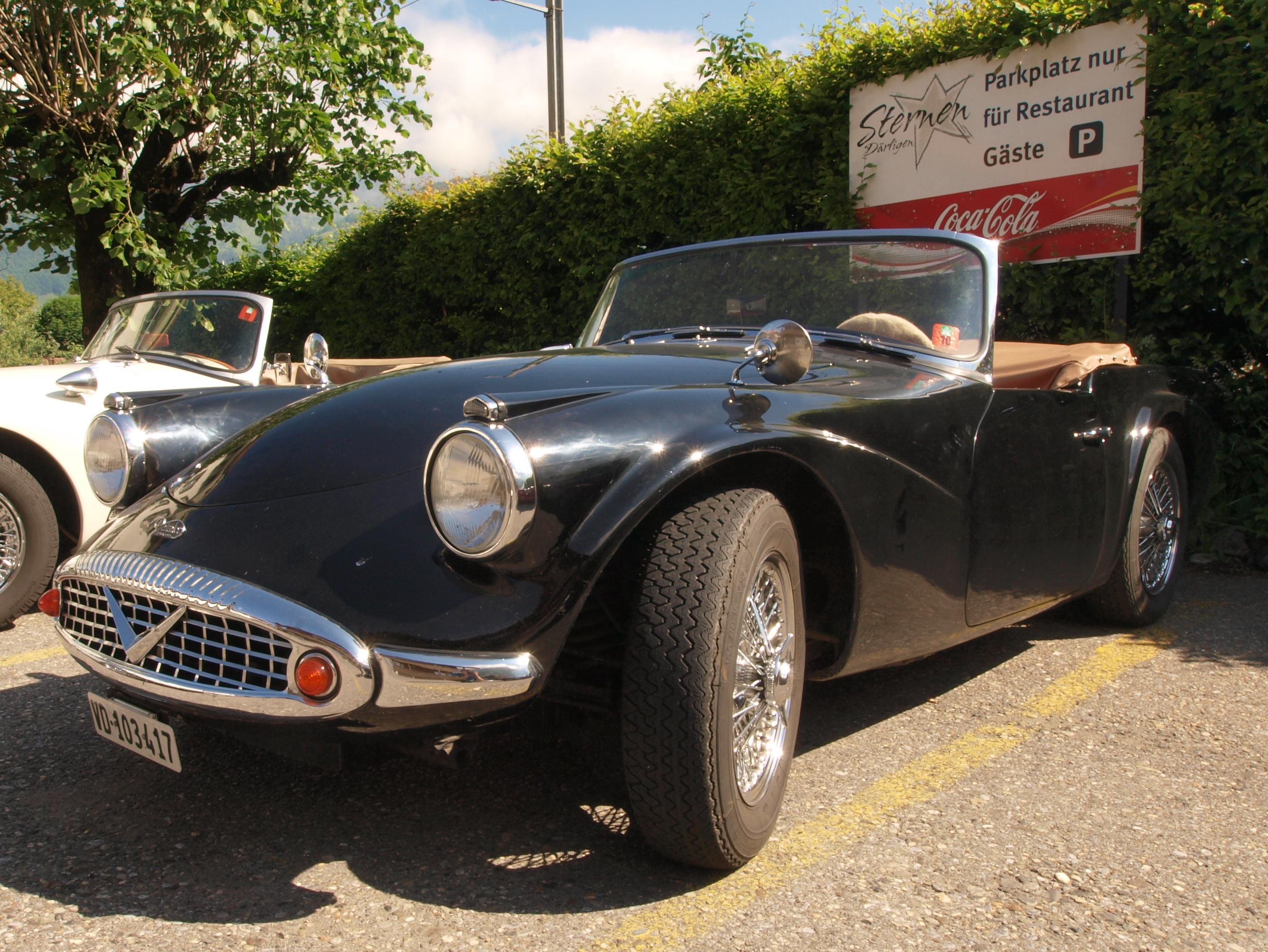
Original specification SP250 with chrome front quarter flashes or "whiskers"

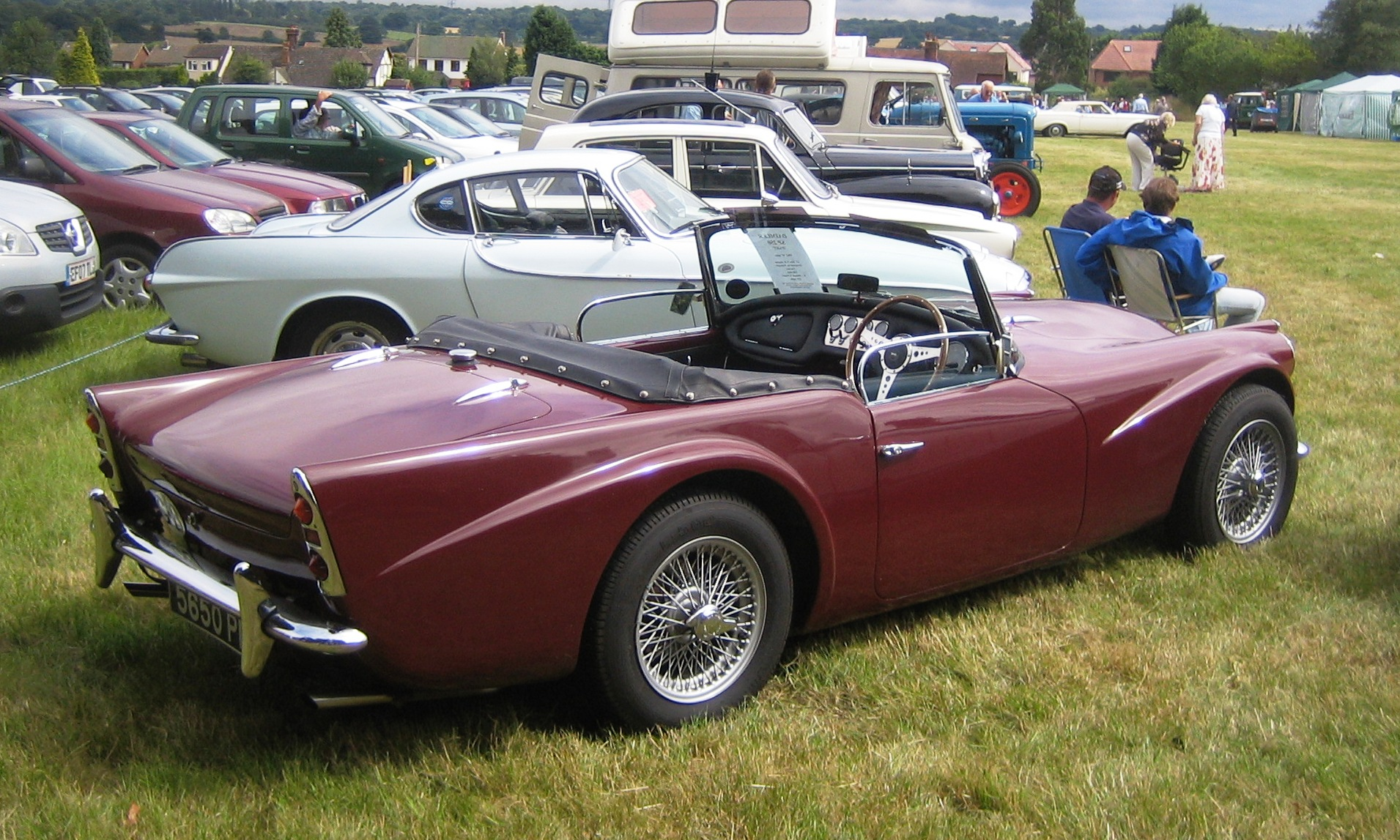
Rear view

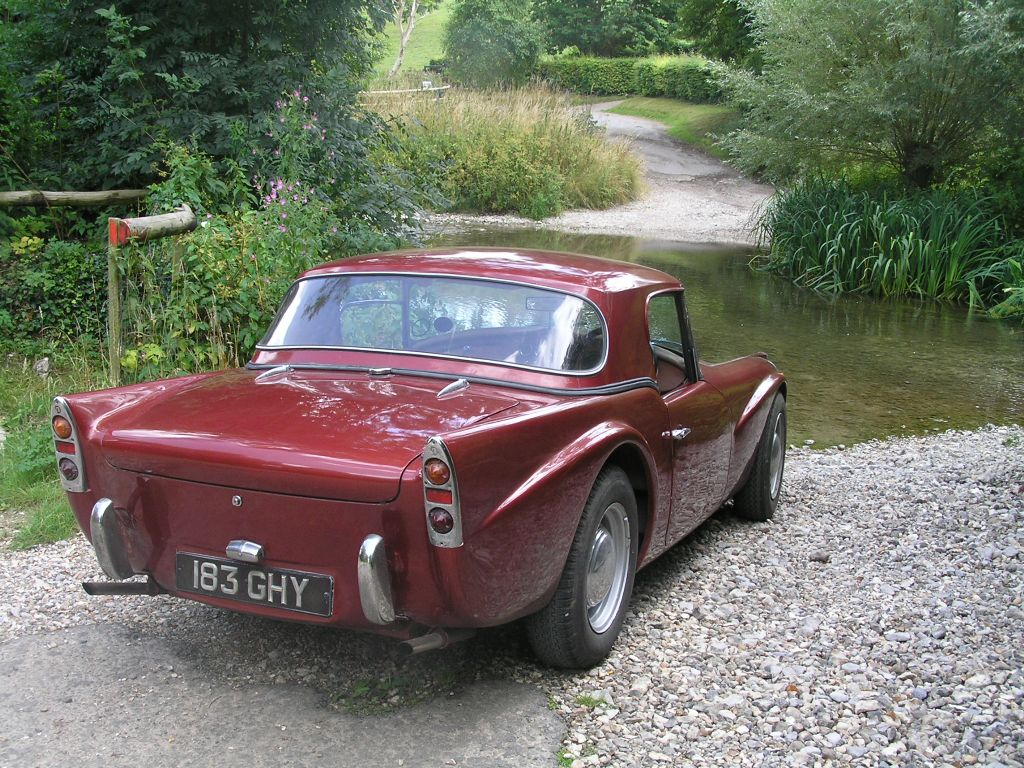
1959 Daimler SP250, original specification, rear view

=== Specification ===
The SP250 had a fibreglass body, four-wheel Girling disc brakes, and a 2.5-litre hemi-head V8 engine designed by Edward Turner. The car was described as a 2+2, but the bench-like rear seat offered very limited legroom unless the front seats were pushed fully forward.

- Engine: V-8 iron block, water-cooled, OHV, bore 76 mm x stroke 70 mm, capacity 2547 cc. Single central camshaft-operated valves through short pushrods with double heavy-duty valve springs. Aluminium alloy hemispherical cylinder heads. Stiff 5 main bearing crankshaft, dynamically balanced. Compression ratio 8.2:1. Twin SU carburettors. bhp 140 @ 5800 rpm. Max Torque 155 lb⋅ft (210 N⋅m) at 3600 rpm. SU electric fuel pump.
- Ignition: Coil and distributor with conventional automatic advance & retard.
- Lubrication: Submerged gear oil pump with full flow filter. Sump capacity 1.75 US gallons.
- Cooling: Pressurised radiator with fan, pump and thermostat control.
- Transmission: Four speeds with synchromesh on top three ratios. Provision for overdrive. Automatic optional.
- Rear Axle: Hypoid bevel 3.58:1
- Steering: Cam & follower.
- Suspension: Front independent with coil springs. Rear live axle with half-elliptic leaf springs. Oversize dampers.
- Brakes: Girling Discs on all four wheels, hydraulic operation.

=== Optional extras ===
The management of Daimler decided to make a large number of the car's features optional extras because automotive import duties into the United States were not applied to optional extras.

These items could be ordered for the standard car:

- Wire wheels
- Whitewall tyres
- Adjustable steering column
- Hard top
- Front and rear bumpers
- Windscreen washers
- Heater
- Fog lights
- Seat belts
- Overdrive or automatic gearbox

== Reception ==
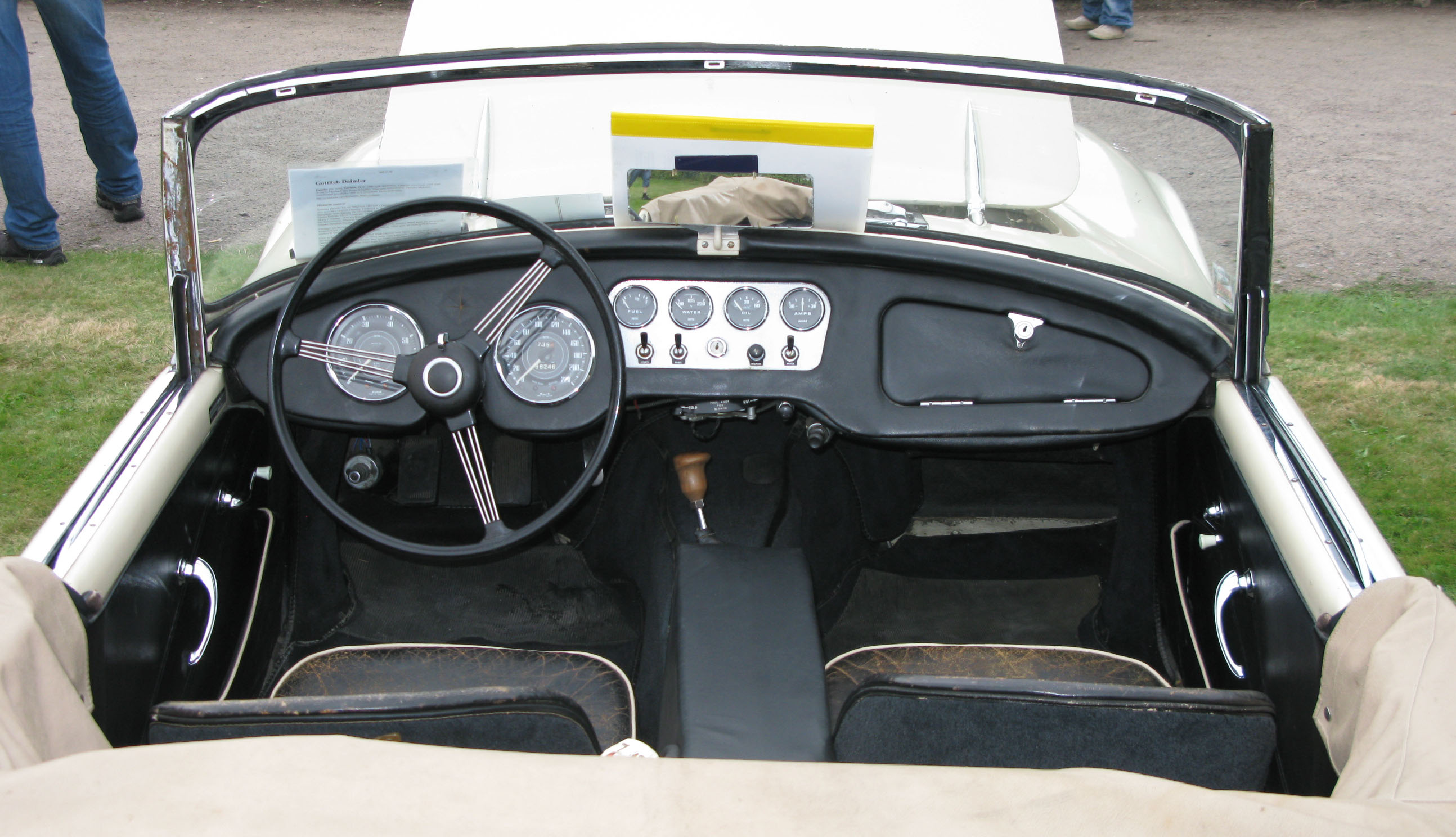
Interior of left-hand drive 1961 SP250

The SP250 was launched as the Daimler Dart in April 1959 at the New York Motor Show, where it was unofficially voted as the ugliest car at the show. Chrysler, whose Dodge division owned the trademark for the "Dart" model name, ordered Daimler to change the name under threat of legal action. With little time to come up with a new name, Daimler used the project number, SP250, as the model number.

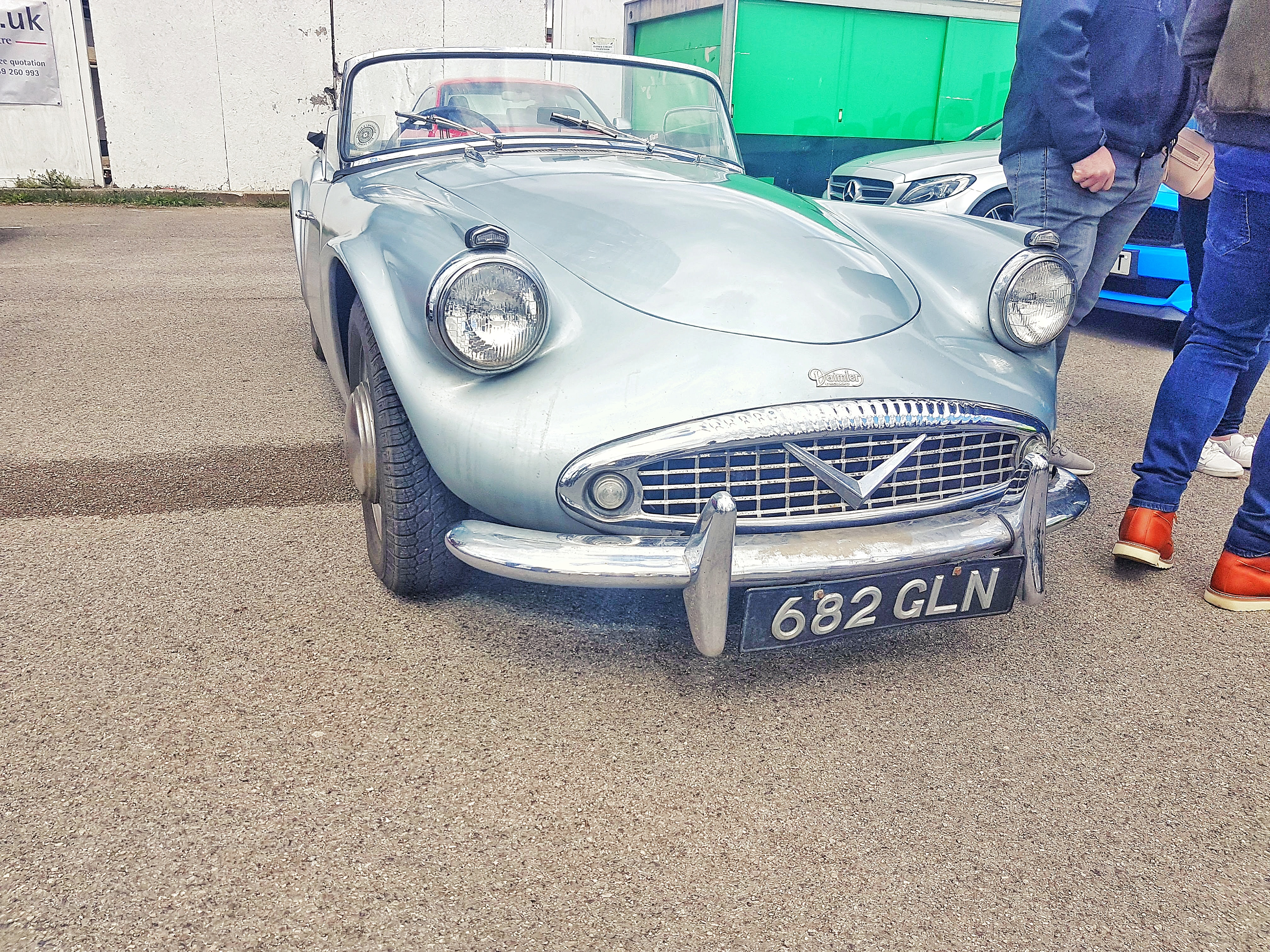
Daimler SP250

=== Police use ===
Between 26 and 30 black SP250s were used by the British Metropolitan Police in London. These were used by the Traffic Department to catch up with speeders, especially café racers. The police cars used the Borg-Warner Model 8 three-speed automatic, which the Metropolitan Police found to be better for town work and high-speed chases, and was also found to be more economical, avoiding the clutch wear that a manual car would develop with usage between 18 and 24 hours a day. Traffic police in Bristol, Cambridge, Liverpool, Manchester, Southend, and Surrey also used the SP250 for speed enforcement, as did police forces in Australia and New Zealand. After the opening of the first section of the M1 in 1959, the Bedfordshire police used the SP250 for motorway patrol.

== Development ==
=== B-spec ===
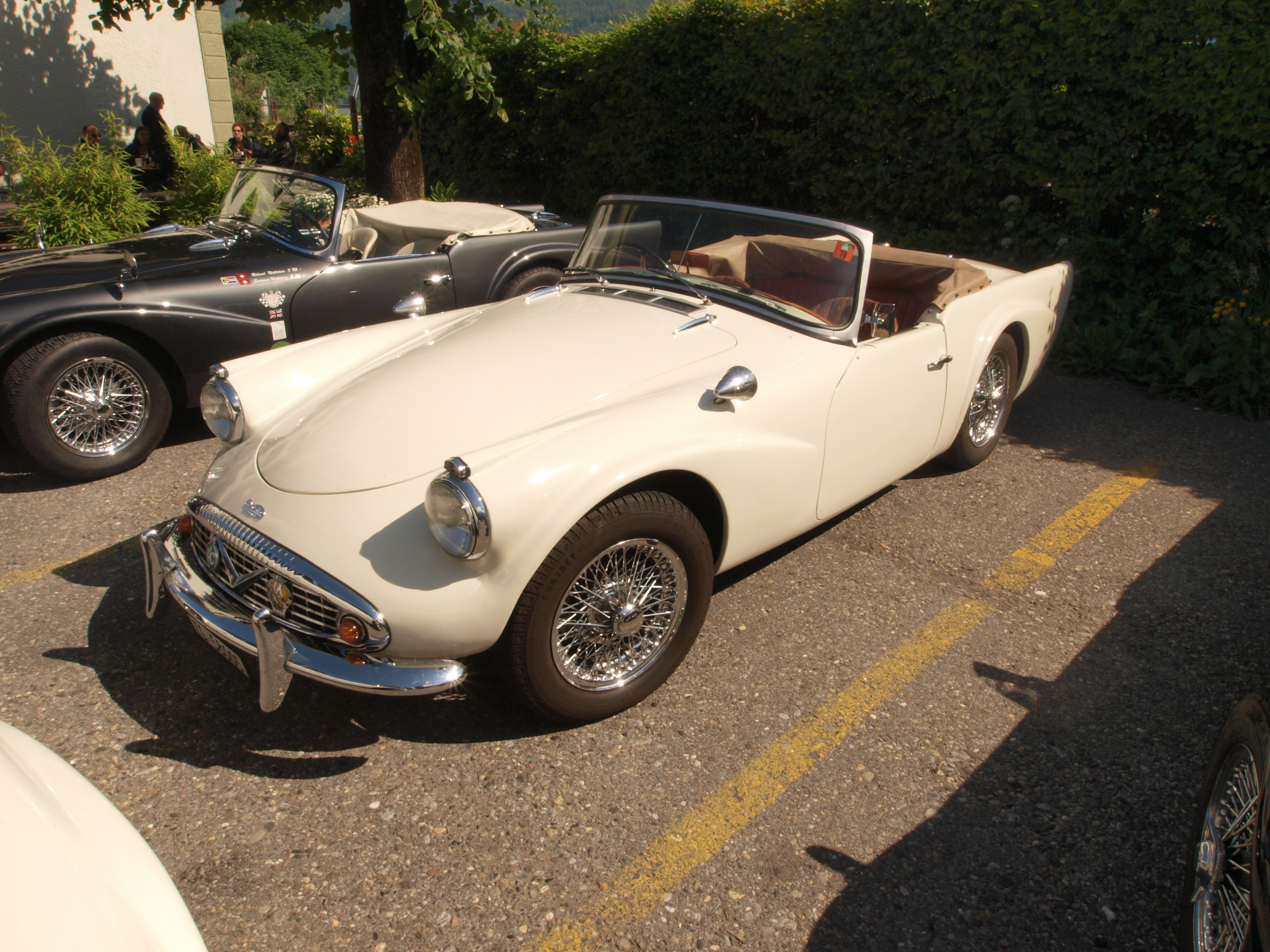
Later version with front bumper, no quarter flashes, and no recess behind the door handle

Jaguar bought Daimler in 1960, and were immediately concerned about the chassis flex. They brought out the "B-spec" version with extra outriggers on the chassis and a strengthening hoop between the A posts. Also, other detail improvements included an adjustable steering column. B-spec and C-spec cars do not have the "whiskers" that A-spec cars have and some do not have the optional front bumper, so very little front protection exists for these cars.

=== C-spec ===
The "C-spec" version, introduced in April 1963, included a trickle-charger socket, a heater/demister unit, and a cigarette lighter as standard equipment.

=== Prototypes ===
==== DP250 ====
The DP250 was a sports saloon based on the SP250's chassis. A DP250, built on chassis no. 100571, was exhibited in 1959 at Hooper's stand during the coachbuilder's last appearance at the Earls Court Motor Show.

Daimler had prepared a sales brochure for the DP250, but it did not enter production. Between two and seven prototypes were made. The show car had a steel body, but some of the prototypes may have been made from fibreglass.

After Jaguar Cars bought the Daimler Company from BSA, William Lyons ordered a fibreglass-bodied DP250 prototype to be completed. Upon seeing the finished car, he had it scrapped immediately and ended the project. None of the prototypes survive; the show car is believed to have been destroyed while being tested at MIRA.

==== SX250 ====
Ogle Design produced a coupé version called the SX250. It was shown at the 1962 Earls Court Motor Show, but it was not taken up by Daimler and the body design was later used for the Reliant Scimitar.

SP252

The SP252 was designed and conceived by Sir William Lyons as a replacement for the SP250 over the period 1961-1963. Daimler had allocated six prototype chassis numbers to the original SP250 programme: 100000, 100001, and 100002 were used for the SP250, this left chassis numbers 100003, 100004, and 100005 unallocated. Sir William Lyon designed what would become SP252 as a replacement (or Mark II) version of the SP250. Chassis 100003 was fitted with rack-and-pinion steering as an improvement over the standard Daimler steering box. It was also fitted with torsion bar front suspension, the same as the E-type in an attempt to improve road-holding although the car was said to be unstable. Sir William styled the body and Fred Gardner, who ran Jaguar’s prototype bodyshop, and was the master at interpreting Sir William’s designs, built a wood and fibreglass mock-up at Browns Lane. While Sir William was not ecstatic about the mock-up, he gave the go-ahead to develop it further. This prototype was never registered and was later dismantled at the factory and scrapped. A full fibreglass body was then made and fitted to chassis 100004 based on standard SP250 running gear.

Chassis 100003 and 100004 were broken up by the factory and the body from chassis 100004 was fitted to a standard B-spec SP250 chassis and given the last unallocated experimental chassis number of 100005 and nominated an SP252, this then being the only such SP252.

The car was painted maroon and had a grey leather interior. Sir William had included many styling cues from the E-type, which was proving to be a great sales success following its launch in Geneva in 1961. The front-wing design was changed radically, looking to many people, like those of an MGB. The Daimler SP250 had sidelights above the headlamps, these were removed, dropping the wing line, and replaced with sidelights from the Jaguar E-type below the headlamps. The distinctive flared wheel arches were removed from both front and rear wings, producing a much cleaner, smoother line to the bodywork. The other major change to the body was the replacement of the "grinning fish" grille with a much cleaner, more modern grille and slim-line bumpers with E-type over-riders. Very little change, though, was made in the rear wings.

The interior could almost have been lifted straight from an E-type with the tachometer and speedometer in front of the driver. A central panel, finished in aluminium, contained the four smaller gauges, the light switch, ignition key, and ancillary switches. The sliding heater and choke controls were likewise identical to those in an E-type. The adjustable wood-rimmed steering wheel, handbrake, and even the windscreen, interior mirror and strut, and windscreen vents came from the E-type parts bin.

Other improvements included under the covers with bonnet and boot lid being fitted with spring-loaded hinges – a great improvement over the SP250’s minimalist springs and stays. The car was even fitted with twin fuel tanks with a filler in each rear wing, as was common in large Jaguar saloon cars of the period.

As was customary, Sir William had the car driven round to his home, Wappenbury Hall in Warwickshire, for further consideration and asked for a viability study to be completed. The outcome of this was that it would not be an economic proposition, as the SP250’s fibreglass body was very labour-intensive and the car took 2½ times as many man-days to build as the E-type. This meant that even if the SP250 Mark II version of the car sold, it would never be profitable, and the project was shelved.

SP252 was consigned to a corner of the Browns Lane factory. In 1967, the car was spotted in storage by Peter Ashworth, an entrepreneur in the entertainments industry and a regular Jaguar customer, who wanted it for his wife. He managed to convince the then-Jaguar MD, Lofty England, to sell him the car and it was registered LHP 307F in September 1967.

Mrs Ashworth (already an owner of a V8 saloon) apparently was not that impressed with its heavy steering, and the SP252 found its way back to the factory, where Duncan Saunders, at the time general secretary, later patron, of the Daimler Lanchester Owners Club (DLOC), took it for a test drive in early 1968. At the time, the odometer showed just 619 miles and the offer price was around £700-£800.

Later that year, Tom Sweet purchased the car for £750 and kept it until 1994, selling it to Brian Peacock. During the later part of Tom Sweet’s ownership, SP252 was "rediscovered" and featured in a number of motoring magazines, including DLOC’s own magazine Driving Member.

In 1994, Brian Peacock bought it and started a long-term restoration, taking in all 8-9 years in its restoration, completing repairs to the chassis and the bodywork, and overhauling the brakes and suspension. He had the car repainted, fitted a new windscreen, and retrimmed the interior and the hood.

As this car was a prototype, many hours were spent in assessing its body construction, as most parts other than the chassis are unique to the car – except for the dashboard, which is very early E-type. A later model wood-rimmed steering wheel was fitted and remains on the car.

When SP252 left the factory, it was without a proper grille, the one that it wears today was produced during the restoration programme and follows as closely as possible that seen in the 1968 period pictures, where it is believed that the grille was "cardboard and silver paper". The traditional Daimler "flutes" were handcrafted by Brian Peacock, as it was thought that a Daimler must have her "crinkles". The only surviving example of the SP252, chassis 10005 (LHP 307F) is currently on display at the Jaguar Daimler Heritage Trust.

== Performance ==
A hardtop car tested by The Motor in 1960 had a top speed of 123.7 mph (199.1 km/h) and accelerated from 0–60 mph (97 km/h) in 8.9 seconds. A fuel consumption of 25 miles per imperial gallon (11 L/100 km; 21 mpg_{‑US}) was recorded. The test car cost £1,489 including taxes.

== Legacy ==
In all, 2,654 SP250s were produced in five years of production, far short of the projection of 3,000 per year by the second year of production.

Jaguar built a prototype replacement under project number SP252 with a neater body style, but decided not to proceed with production. According to former Jaguar chairman Lofty England, the cost to build the SP252 would have been greater than that of Jaguar's popular and more expensive E-Type, thereby creating internal competition from a product with no practical profit margin and uncertain market acceptance.

The 2.5-litre V8 engine used in the SP250 was used by Jaguar to power the smaller saloon Daimler had wanted from the start. This was basically a Jaguar Mark 2 with the V8 engine from the SP250 modified to fit in the Mark 2 engine bay and revised interior, trim, and suspension settings. Sold between 1962 and 1967 as the Daimler 2½-litre V8 and from 1967 to 1969 as the Daimler V8-250, this was, as at 1995, the Daimler car with the highest production figures.

=== Die-cast models ===
- Spot-on produced a model of the SP250 in the 1960s, available in a number of colours including red and light blue.
- Crossway models introduced a model in 2007, available in various colours and with or without the hood up.
- NOREV produced an open-top SP2520 model in BRG and possibly other colours.
- Oxford Diecasts produced several versions of the SP250 with wire or steel wheels in police and civilian versions both open, side windows raised, and with top closed.

=== Media appearances ===
- Modesty Blaise had an ivory-coloured SP250 in the early book versions of her adventures, and it also appeared occasionally in the comic strip.
