= Local content policies =

Local content policies (LCPs) are government rules or obligations that make sure when development projects happen in a country, local people and local businesses benefit from them, not just foreign partners. These policies aim to create jobs, support local companies, build local powerhouse, grow local and regional economies, and ensure that these projects deliver meaningful local contribution and benefits beyond the extraction of natural resources.

In simple terms:

"If you make money here, you should also hire here, buy here, and build skills here."

Simply, local content policies (LCPs) are used to create jobs, grow the economy, and prevent countries from being harmed by over-reliance on natural resources. They are important in countries rich in oil, gas, and minerals, and are now also being used in renewable energy projects like wind and solar.

There are several successful cases like LCPs in Norway and in China.

LCPs are closely linked to sustainability goals or SDGs. Researchers find that very little research has looked at how LCPs support environmental and climate goals, creating a gap between research and today's policy needs.

Researchers argue that policymakers should not only evaluate existing policies but also help design better, more sustainable local content policies.
