= Ogle SX1000 =

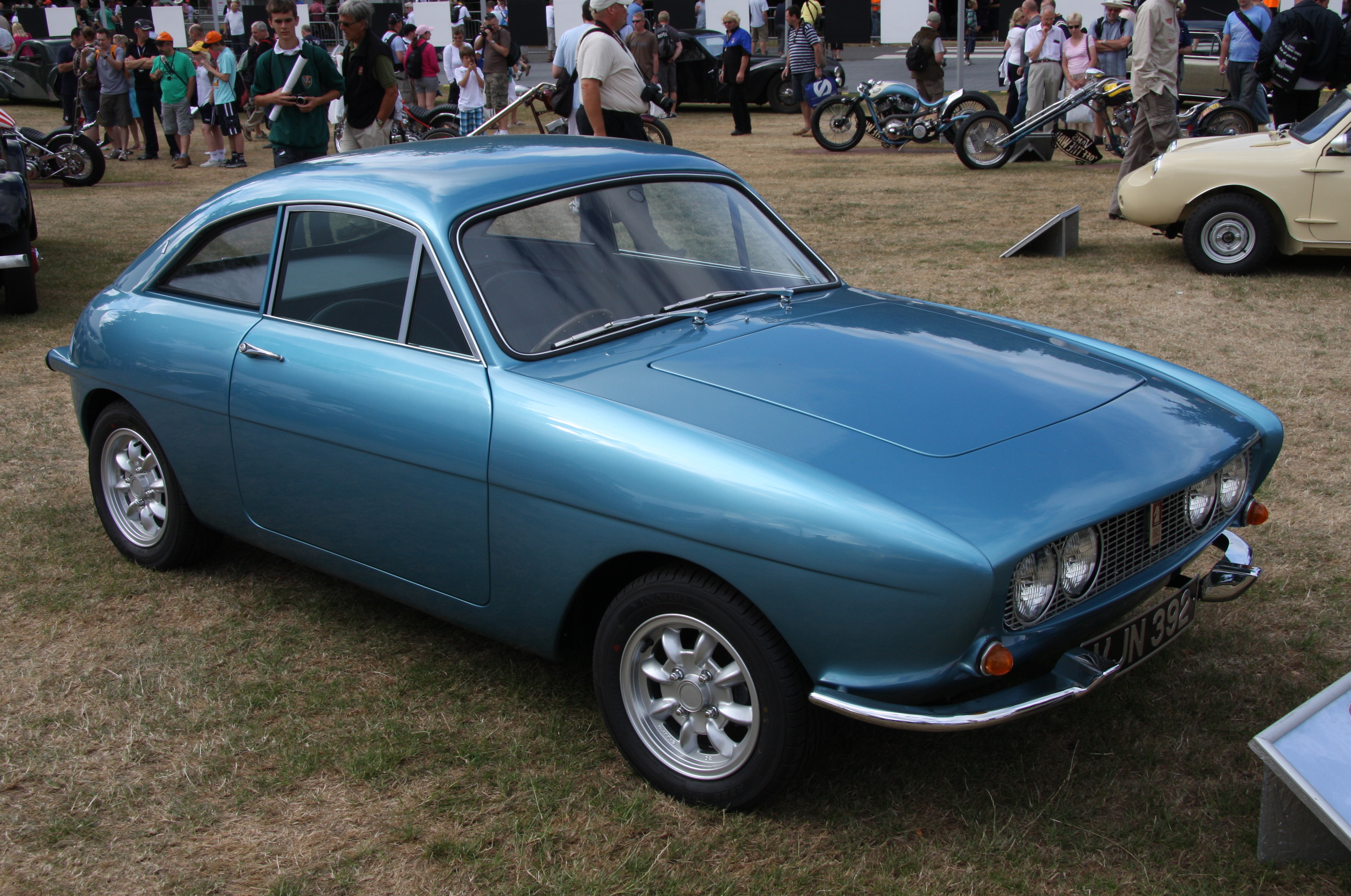

Overview
- Manufacturer: David Ogle Ltd. (Ogle Design)
- Production: 1962–1964
- Designer: David Ogle

Body and chassis
- Body style: 2-door coupe
- Layout: Front-engine, front-wheel-drive
- Related: Mini

Powertrain
- Engine: 997cc four-cylinder

The Ogle SX1000 is a front-wheel drive Mini-based coupé-style motor vehicle designed by David Ogle, the founder of Ogle Design. The car was introduced to the public in December 1961, and from the following year David Ogle Ltd. offered to transform any customer's Mini into an SX1000 for £550 (equivalent to £14,800 in 2023 (Note: UK Retail Price Index inflation figures are based on data from Clark, Gregory (2017), "The Annual RPI and Average Earnings for Britain, 1209 to Present (New Series)", MeasuringWorth)) (Note: The SX1000 cost considerably more to build than its selling price of £550. In the words of Ogle's then chairman John Ogier, "It would have been cheaper to give any customer £300 and told him to go away!") All of the car's mechanical components came from the Mini, but with a new fibreglass body shell. The windscreen comes from the Riley 1.5, as does the indicator stalk on the right of the steering column. (Note: David Ogle had already designed a glassfibre body for the Riley 1.5.) The SX1000 has the same front disc and rear drum brake arrangement as the standard Mini Cooper.

A racing version of the SX1000 was produced later in 1962, the Ogle Lightweight GT. As well as its lighter body it had a built-in rollbar, lowered suspension, and bucket seats.

An Ogle SX1000 can be seen in the Beatles movie "A Hard Days Night".

== Engine and performance ==
BMC, the manufacturer of the Mini on which the SX1000 is based, initially refused to supply new parts to David Ogle Ltd, but eventually relented on condition that the word Mini was not mentioned in any promotional material. All Ogle cars were subsequently supplied with new Mini Cooper 997 cc (60.8 cu in) engines, and priced at £1,190 (equivalent to £32,100 in 2023).

The motoring magazine Autocar was the first to road test the SX1000, over more than 1600 kilometres (1000 mi). Their complimentary test report stated that the car was able to exceed 159 km/h (99 mph). Motorsport reported in their test that the car could reach 140 km/h (90 mph) on the straight and 160 km/h (100 mph) on a long downhill gradient, albeit with some road rumble and vibration through the gear lever. Fuel consumption was 35 mpg_{‑imp} (8.1 L/100 km; 29 mpg_{‑US}). While Motorsport magazine's reviewer was impressed by the car, and in particular by the high quality of its glassfibre body, the report's overall conclusion was that "Economically it is difficult to justify the purchase of a car like this which is heavier than the standard car from which it is derived and has fewer seats".

== End of production ==
In May 1962 David Ogle was killed in a road traffic accident when he crashed into a lorry while driving an Ogle Lightweight GT to the Brands Hatch racing circuit. The company decided to cease production of the SX1000 following Ogle's death. The last cars were completed towards the end of 1963, by which time 69 had been built.

== Later developments ==
The moulds for the SX1000 were sold to Norman Fletcher of Fletcher Marine in 1966, and the following year saw its reappearance as the Fletcher GT. In 2010, Nostalgia Cars UK began offering a replica version of the SX1000 under the name of "SX1275" - and later the "NC Coupe" - up until 2021 when the company ceased trading.
