= Scammell Scarab =

British 3-wheeled tractor unit

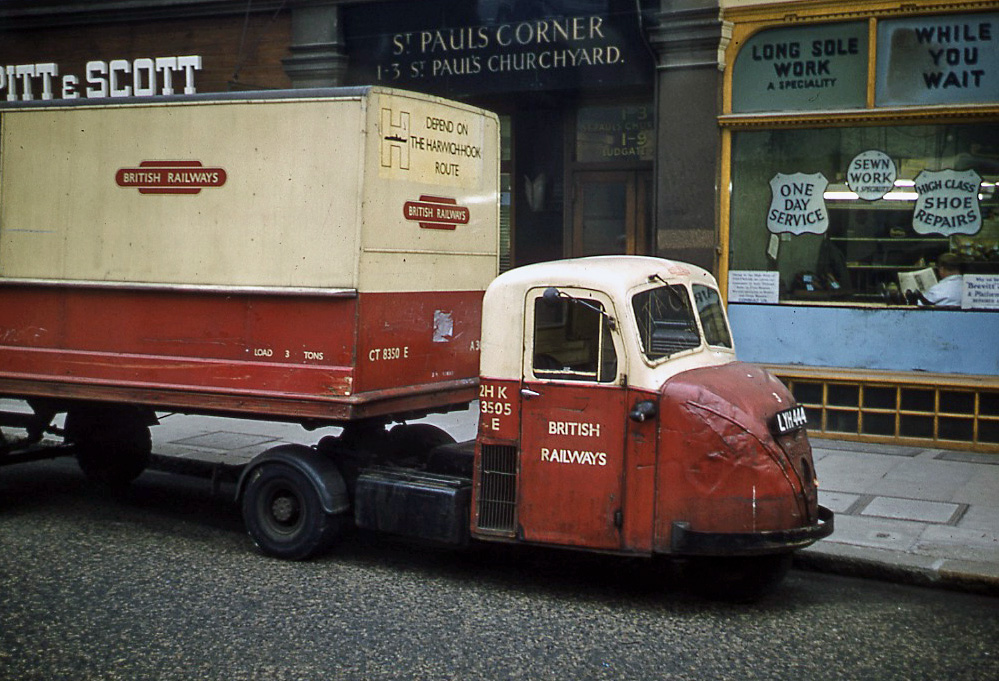
Scammell Scarab in British Railways livery, London, 1962.

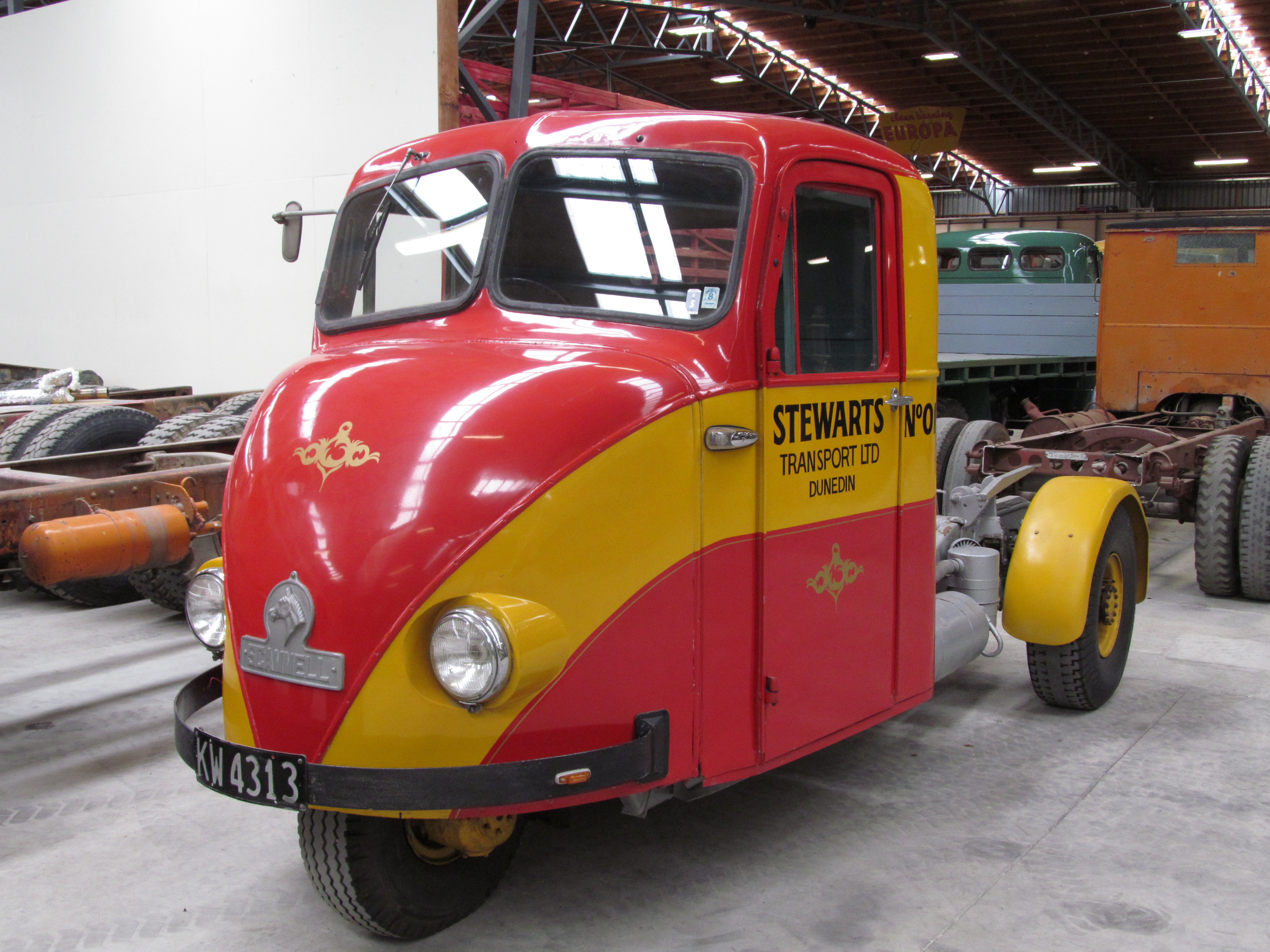
Scammell Scarab with dual headlamps

The Scammell Scarab is a British 3-wheeled tractor unit produced by the truck manufacturer Scammell between 1948 and 1967. These vehicles are often known as "Snub-nose Trucks" or "Snub-nose Lorries" because of the round hood in front of the cab.

== Development and production history ==
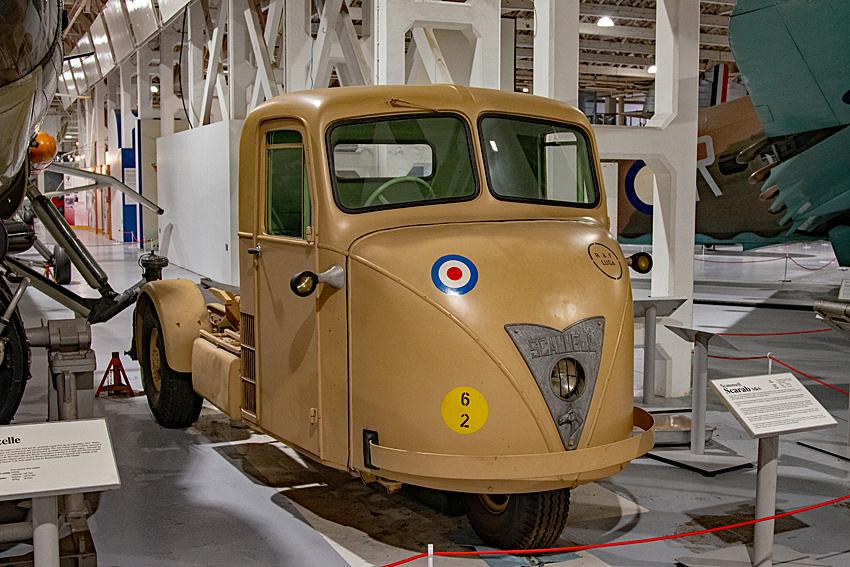
Scammel Scarab in RAF desert livery

The Scammell Scarab was the successor to the Scammell Mechanical Horse and production began in 1948. Its name is commonly believed to be derived from the rounded bonnet that resembled the elytra (wing covers) of a Scarab beetle, but the name really comes from a more conventional source. It was a portmanteau of Scammell and the Arab horse which the Mechanical Horse replaced in British Railways usage. The official Scammell Lorries advertisement film makes reference to this. It was extremely popular with British Railways and other companies which made deliveries within built-up areas. The Ministry of Defence also used the Scarab and trailers for predominantly internal transport on large military bases.

In the late 1920s, railway companies were looking for a suitable vehicle to use on their town parcels delivery traffic, which was predominantly horse-drawn. The London Midland & Scottish Railway experimented with various ideas and in late 1930 announced, jointly with Karrier Motors, a tractor unit for this purpose. The vehicle, the Karrier Cob, was powered by a twin-cylinder Jowett engine and utilised a mechanism to couple existing horse trailers to the tractor units. Meanwhile the London & North Eastern Railway had approached Napier, the quality car and aero-engine makers, for an answer to the same problem. They came up with some ideas, but did not wish to develop the concept and sold the project to Scammell Lorries of Watford. Their designer, O. D. North, refined and further developed the concept of the three-wheel tractor unit which automatically coupled and un-coupled trailers and in 1934 announced the introduction of the Mechanical Horse.

The Scammell Mechanical Horse, with its very 'square' wooden cab and steel chassis, remained largely unchanged until the late 1940s when the tractor section was redesigned, creating the Scammell Scarab, which featured the same successful automatic coupling from the original but now used the Scammell 2,090 cc side-valve engine in both the three- and six-ton versions. A diesel version was also introduced with a Perkins engine. The Scarab's cab was more rounded and made from steel including roof and windscreen panels pressed from steel tools obtained from Bedford that made up the roof of the 'O' type lorry. With the engine being mounted lower and more centrally than in the Mechanical Horse, the Scarab was much more stable. The railways for which this style of vehicle was originally designed continued to be a primary customer, although there were many other users, the manoeuvrability proving popular for companies operating in city environments.

=== Scammell Townsman ===
Production of the Scarab ceased in 1967 and it was replaced with the Scammell Townsman that now featured a fibreglass cab. Like that fitted to the Trunker, Handyman and Routeman, it was designed by Giovanni Michelotti. The Townsman utilised many developments in large vehicles including vacuum-assisted hydraulic brakes and although the same automatic coupling feature was used, this now used a vacuum-operated release mechanism rather than the hand lever found in earlier models. Despite numerous improvements, the Townsman was mainly sold to British Rail and the Royal Mail and production ended in 1968 as forthcoming construction and use regulations mandating dual-line brakes on articulated combinations could not be met. Formation of British Leyland also affected to ending of Scammell Townsman production.

=== Pony Mecanique ===
The Scammell or "FAR" was also made under licence by the French company Chenard-Walcker and used the Citroën Traction Avant engine. Production of this version began in 1937; it was known in France as the Pony Mécanique. This continued in production, in various versions, until 1970.

=== Scarab Four ===
A four-wheel version of the Scarab was produced, named "Scarab Four". It was based on the Standard Atlas van chassis, later called the Leyland 20. This chassis was not well-adapted to the job and it was not a great success. The braking performance was much better than the three-wheel version but the independent front suspension gave a bouncy ride. Only a handful were sold in Britain but 60 were exported to South Africa and Macau. There are no known surviving examples of the Scarab Four in the UK.

== Preservation ==
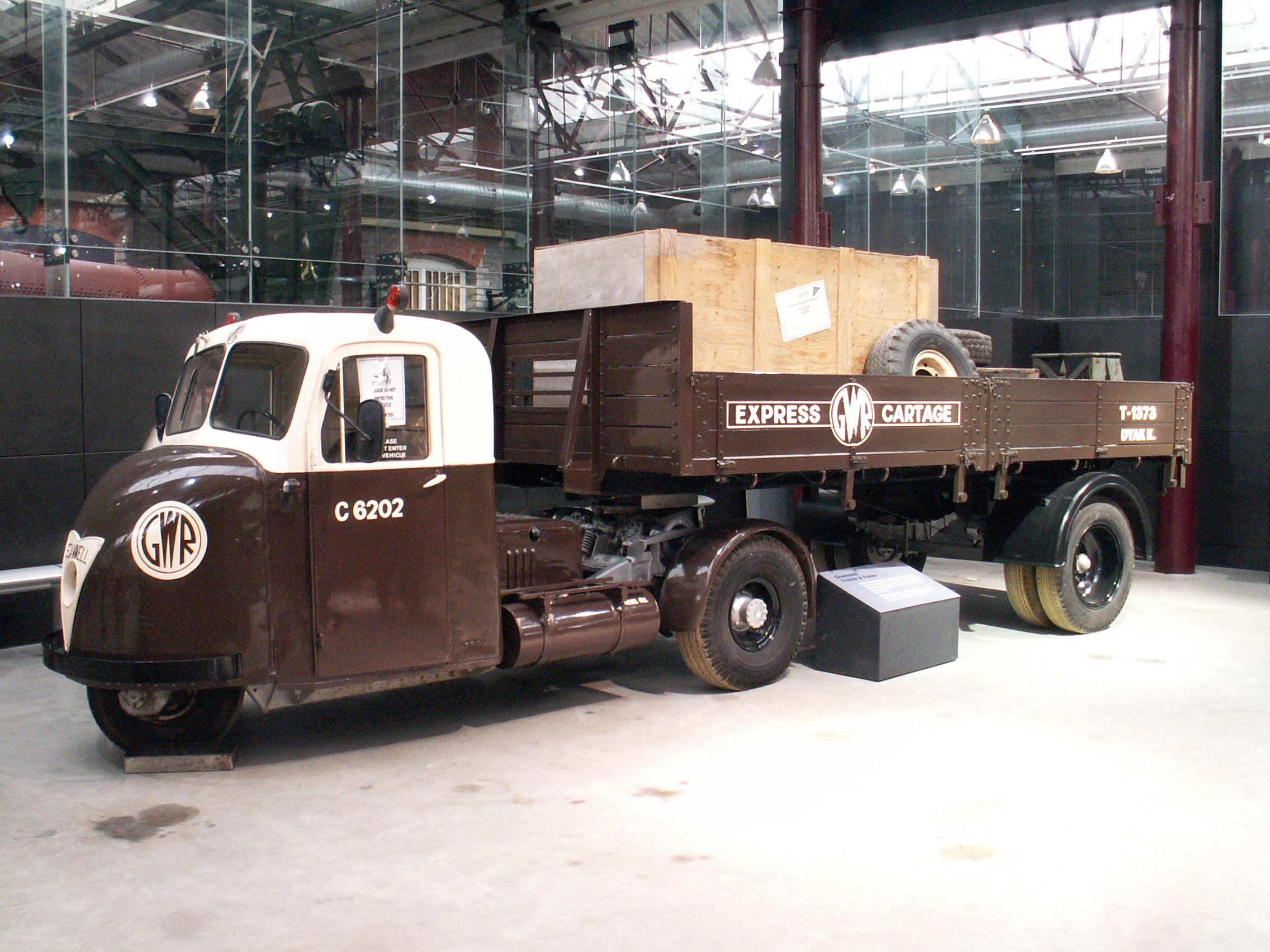
Scammell Scarab and trailer - Museum of the Great Western Railway, Swindon (Note: The GWR livery is inauthentic. While the livery itself is correct, it would have appeared on a Scammell Mechanical Horse, as the Scarab did not begin production until after the nationalization of the GWR into British Railways.)

Scammell Lorries produced approximately 30,000 Mechanical Horses of all types; of these, about 30 original Mechanical Horses, 60 Scarabs, and 30 Townsman are known to survive together with three Karrier Cobs and two Jen Tugs. Examples may be seen at a number of museums and heritage railways. The Mechanical Horse Club (MHC) was established in 1983 to promote the preservation of Scammell three-wheelers. The MHC regularly have a display stand and several examples of the preserved vehicles within the commercial vehicles section at the annual Great Dorset Steam Fair.

The restoration of a Scarab to working order was the subject of a programme in the third series of Salvage Squad. The final filming session took place at the Vintage Carriage Trust at Ingrow station, on the Keighley & Worth Valley Railway in West Yorkshire, on 22 November 2003, where it was handed back to its owner, Chris Waye, out-shopped in the standard British Railways road vehicle livery of carmine and cream, colloquially referred to as blood and custard.

== In fiction ==
Madge, a character from Thomas & Friends, is based on this vehicle.

== See also ==
Related developments:

- Scammell Mechanical Horse (Scammell)
- Scammell Townsman
- Karrier Cob (Karrier)
- Reliant Ant (Reliant)

An inventor of vans:

- Oliver Danson North
