= Reliant Fox =

Small English utility vehicle manufactured in 1983–1990 by the Reliant Motor Company

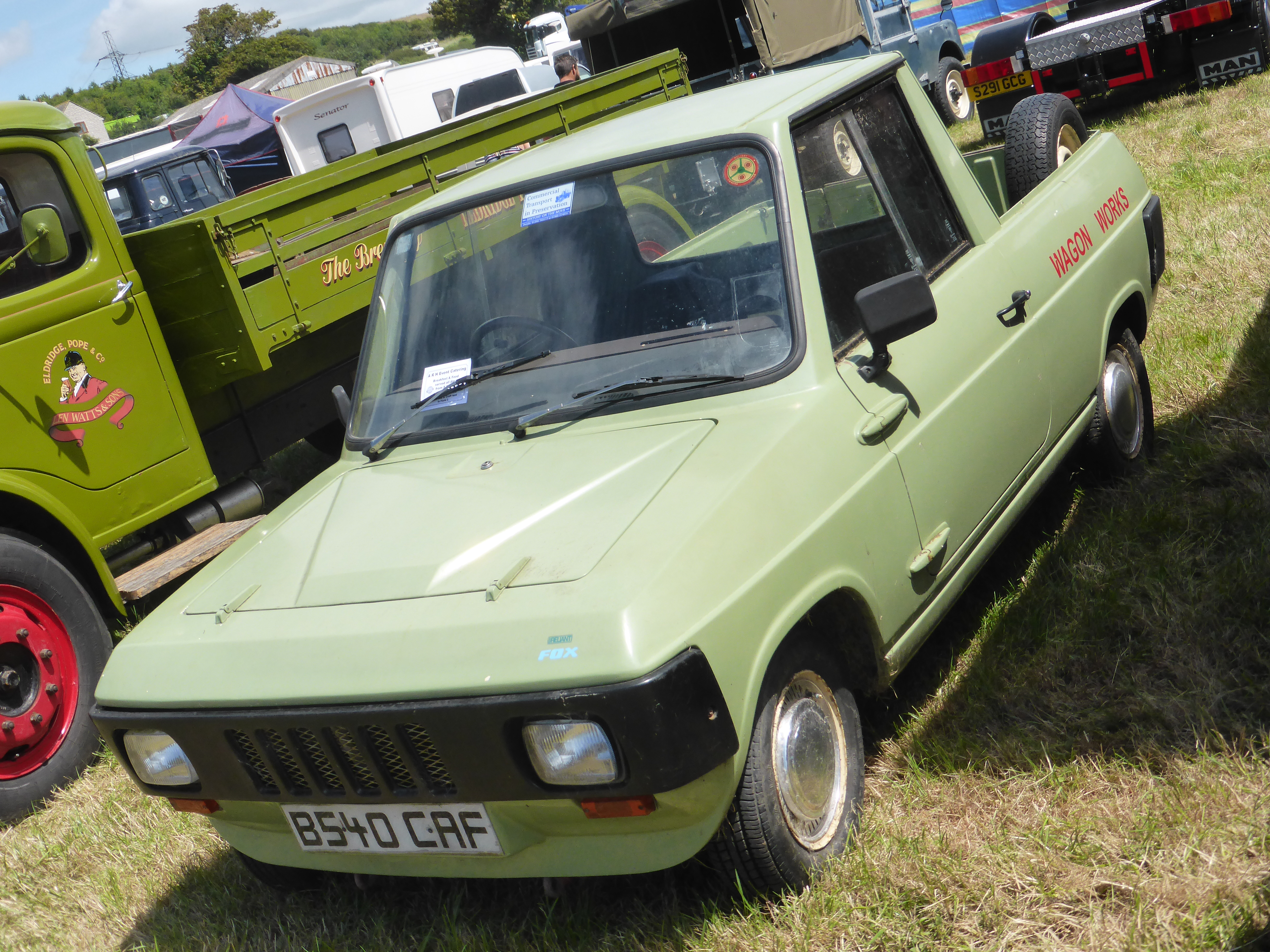

Overview
- Manufacturer: Reliant
- Production: 1983–1990
- Assembly: United Kingdom: Tamworth, England

Body and chassis
- Body style: 2-door utility

Powertrain
- Engine: 848 cc I4
- Transmission: 4 speed manual

Dimensions
- Wheelbase: 84.5 inches (2146 mm)
- Length: 133 inches (3380 mm)
- Width: 61 inches (1540 mm)
- Height: 60 inches (1520 mm)

Chronology
- Predecessor: Reliant Kitten

The Reliant Fox is a small four-wheeled glass-fibre utility vehicle manufactured between 1983 and 1990 by the Reliant Motor Company in Tamworth, England. It used Reliant's own 848cc aluminium inline four-cylinder engine and a galvanised chassis based on that of the Reliant Kitten.

The Fox was one of several small four-wheeled economy vehicles produced by Reliant, a manufacturer well known for its three-wheeled cars and trucks. The Fox could be configured as a pickup with a hard or soft top, an estate car, a van or a convertible, as desired.

== Development ==
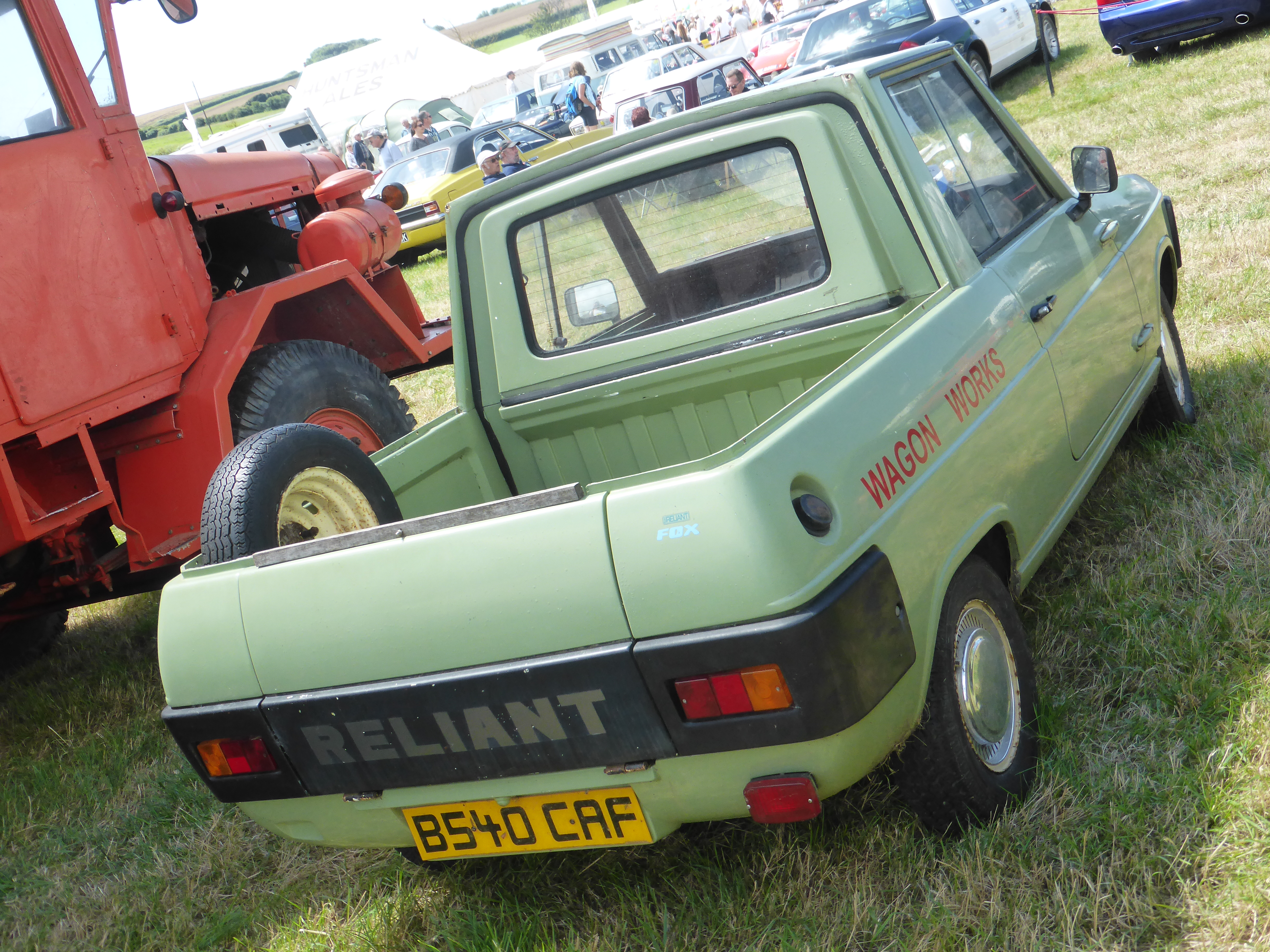
Rear view of a Reliant Fox

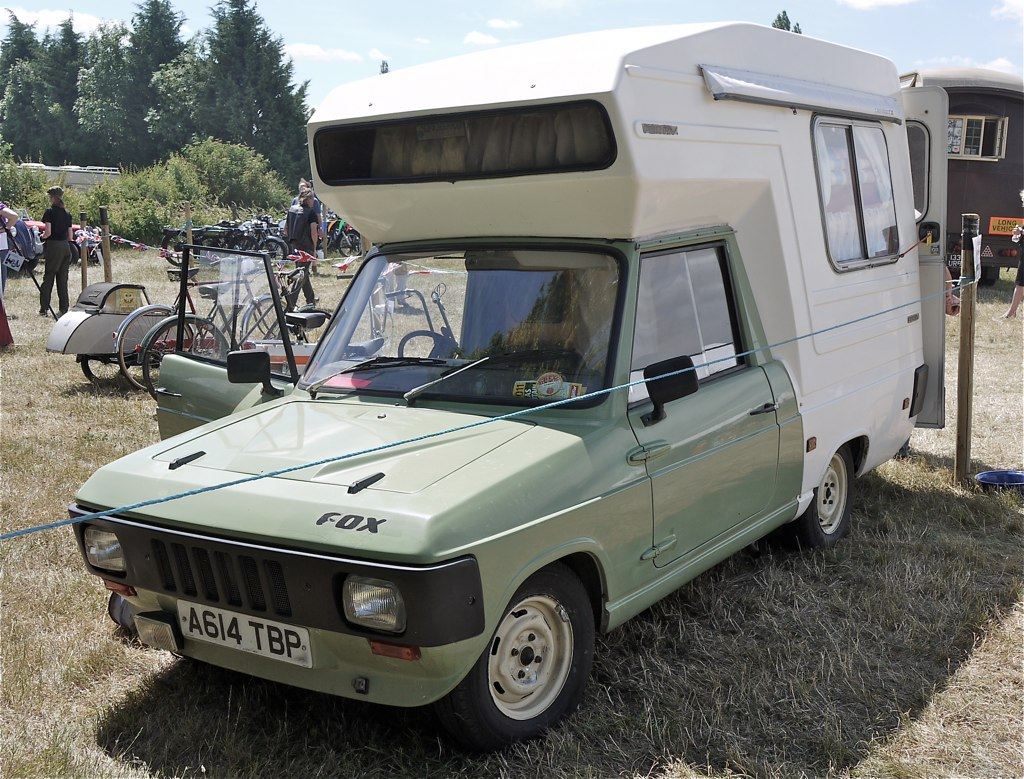
Reliant Fox camper

Reliant had exported technology and designs to several companies and in several countries, including those of the Reliant Robin and Reliant TW9 (aka The Ant) to MEBEA in Greece. But in the case of the Fox, a "reverse" course was followed. In the late 1970s MEBEA attempted to develop a "passenger-utility" vehicle, a type then very popular in Greece, as laws allowed such cars to be taxed as "commercial vehicles" at a rate lower than passenger cars. Because of the law, several companies built such vehicles in Greece, including Namco, Autokinitoviomihania Ellados, MAVA, Automeccanica and others. MEBEA, which had already built the Robin under licence, modified the four-wheel chassis of the Kitten to carry greater weight and developed the prototype of the light utility vehicle which would become the Fox, complete with glass-fibre reinforced body.

For the body design, the Fox appears to have been inspired by an Italian car, the Fiore 127 Gypsy (which was based on the Fiat 127).

In order to produce the Fox, however, MEBEA had to deal jump the hurdle of obtaining "type certification". The process was particularly complex for locally developed "passenger cars", but less so for other types of vehicles. Thus, "MEBEA did what other Greek companies had also done": it found a partner abroad to obtain type certification, for which the procedure was much easier for vehicles that were already certified in another country. Reliant was the obvious choice and it played a significant role in the final development and certification of the version.

After the Fox was no longer being built in Greece, Reliant reused the design for itself instead of shelving it. The UK version had many details changed from the Greek version, with Reliant reportedly spending £500,000 on modifications for the domestic version. Reliant started producing the Fox in its Tamworth factory in 1983, as an "informal successor" to the Kitten. After UK production ended in 1990, a restyle was planned, using the hatchback from the forthcoming Robin and a front end design similar to that of the Reliant Metrocab. But this never got further than the drawing board stage.

== Production ==
Greece

The car was produced in Greece as the MEBEA Fox beginning in 1979. When the law favouring such "passenger-utility" cars was changed in 1983, sales declined and production ended after about 3000 Foxes had been built. That number may have been "inflated" by the manufacturer, though, as automotive historian Labros S. Skartsis writes that the true production number may have been closer to 1000.

The UK

After production ended in Greece, the Fox was built in the UK until 1990. According to the Reliant Kitten Register, which keeps track of all small four-wheeled Reliants, "Fox production topped the 1000 mark between 1983 and 1988", a number that conflicts with the "just over 600" claimed by The Reliant Motor Club as having been built between 1983 and 1990.

Relatively few Foxes seem to have survived. Autocar magazine reported in 2017 that official motor vehicle registration data for 2015 showed just one Fox on the road in the UK, but noted that this figure could be higher as it did not include Foxes on SORN (Statutory Off Road Notice). However, another website says that in 2017, UK vehicle registration data showed 37 Foxes licensed for road use and 123 on full- or part-time SORN.

== Specifications ==
Mebea Fox

The Mebea Fox was created around the Reliant Kitten chassis and its low weight, glass-fibre body, 10-inch wheels and 145 X 10 tyres helped make it a "fun in the sun vehicle", similar to those made by other manufacturers. Like the Kitten, it used the standard Reliant 848cc engine. The Greek Fox weighed 521 kg (1146 lbs) and had a rear axle ratio of 3.55:1.

Reliant Fox

In 1983, the first year of UK production, the Fox used Reliant's usual 848cc aluminium inline four-cylinder engine of 40 hp, which drove the rear wheels through an all-synchromesh four-speed manual gearbox. The rear axle ration was 4.1:1, which allowed the vehicle to carry a 380 kg (840 lb) payload in a "surprisingly large loadspace" measuring 1180 mm (46.5 in) in length by 1250 mm (49.0 in) in width. The body was "rust free GRP" and the chassis "rust resistant galvanised steel". The Fox's overall length was 3380 mm (133 in), its width was 1540 mm (60.5 in) and it rolled on 155 X 12SR radial tyres. Reliant noted that its 7.62 m (25 ft) turning circle was the same as that of a London taxicab, making it "equally at home making deliveries in city traffic or out on the farm". The Fox handbook gives its unladen weight as 640 kg (1410 lbs).

The Fox went on sale in the UK in May 1983, after being shown at the 1982 British Motor Show. Reliant hoped that it would "fill a niche" left by the British Motor Corporation taking the Mini Moke out of production.

The UK version of the Fox had a number of modifications from the Greek version, the most noticeable of which was that the front of the vehicle gained a "skirt" for better aerodynamics at speed. Wheels were 12-inches in diameter instead of 10-inches and the brakes had also had some alterations.

Beginning in its second year of production, 1984, the Fox used the Reliant HT-E "economy" engine, as was fitted to the Reliant Rialto, and which was known as the "yellow top" because of its colour. While still displacing 848cc, it produced 37.5 bhp instead of the 40 bhp from Reliant's standard "red top" engine.

The yellow top also had more low-end torque and by lowering the Fox's rear axle ratio to 4.1:1, it was able to pull additional weight. Heavier springs and a more robust tie bar on the front suspension were added to make the vehicle more suited to commercial uses. The top speed of the Fox was 78 mph and it was able to attain 60 mpg with the yellow top engine. However, a second website quotes much lower mpg for the Fox. Fuelly.com has compiled information on Foxes driven in real world conditions and found a 1984 model that delivers 37.8 mpg and a 1985 that returns 35.4 mpg. Both vehicles are in regular usage.

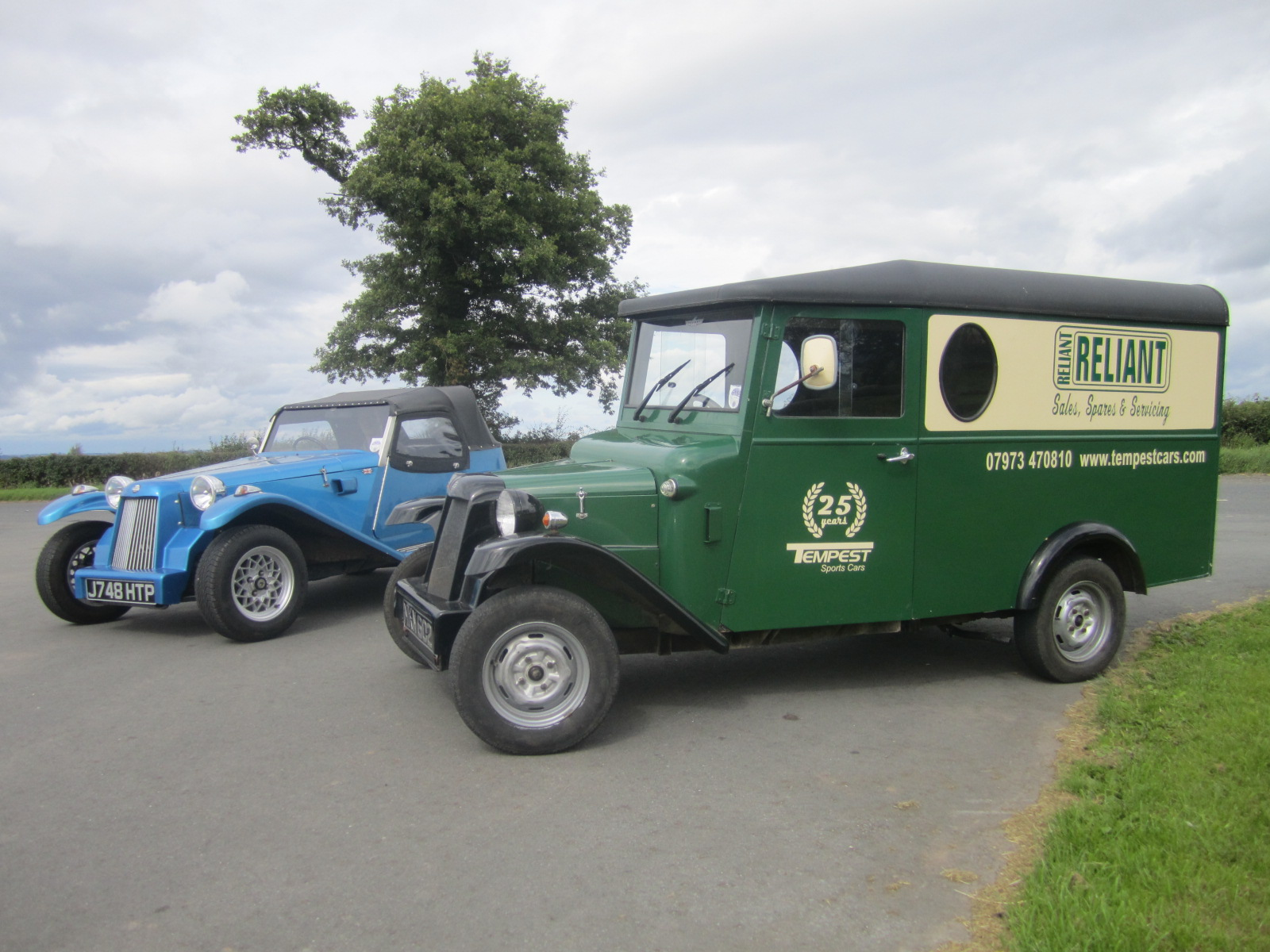
Reliant Tempest 850 two-seater and Vantique are based on the Fox

The Reliant Tempest 850 two-seater sports car and the Vantique van were built on Kitten or Fox chassis, as either kit cars or factory-built, after the Kitten and Fox went out of production. Other vehicles built on Kitten/Fox running gear are the Cipher, the Jimp, the Salamander, the Asquith van and the Liege sports car.

== Sources ==
- "Quattroruote, Tutte le Auto del Mondo 1982–1983", Editoriale Domus, Milano (1982) (in this book the MEBEA Fox is erroneously presented as "Fox-MEBEA")
- "Daily Express Guide to 1982 World Cars", Motorfair Edition (1981)
