= Reliant Kitten =

Small four-wheel car produced by Reliant (1975-1982)

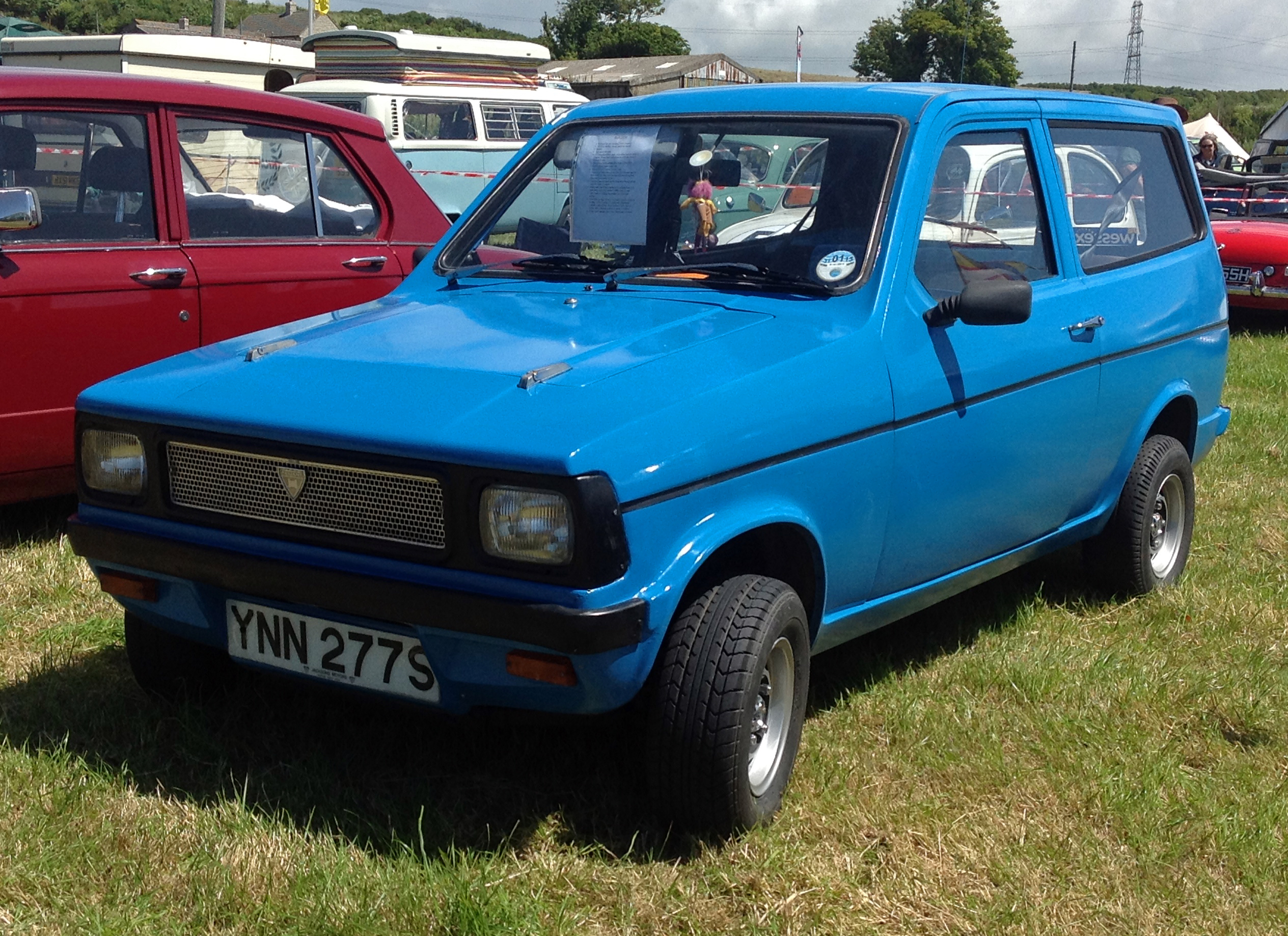

Overview
- Manufacturer: Reliant
- Production: 1975–1982; 4,074 made
- Assembly: United Kingdom: Tamworth, England
- Designer: Ogle

Body and chassis
- Body style: 2-door saloon 3-door estate car/van

Powertrain
- Engine: 848 cc light alloy I4

Dimensions
- Wheelbase: 84.5 in (2,146 mm)
- Length: 131 in (3,327 mm)Saloon
- Width: 56 in (1,422 mm)
- Height: 55 in (1,397 mm)
- Kerb weight: 1120 pounds (508 KG)

Chronology
- Predecessor: Reliant Rebel
- Successor: Reliant Fox

The Reliant Kitten is a small four-wheeled economy car which was manufactured from 1975 to 1982 in saloon, van and estate variants by the Reliant Motor Company in Tamworth, England. It was Reliant's second attempt at selling in the small car economy market after the 1960s Reliant Rebel.

The Kitten is based around the design of the original 1970s Reliant Robin and was the first production car to use Reliant's 850 cc engine.

Even though UK production ended in 1982, the whole production assembly was sold to Indian firm Sipani Automobiles where production ran until the mid 1990s.

== Development and history ==
The Kitten was Reliant's second attempt to sell into the general small car market, the previous attempt in the 1960s was the Reliant Rebel and Reliant at the time told Ogle Design to make the Rebel look completely different to the Reliant Regal 3/25 it was based on (but keep the same doors and windscreen) but for the new Kitten design Reliant told Ogle to keep as much of the Robin as they could to keep production costs down by parts sharing, as Reliant knew sales would be lower than the current Robin.

The Kitten was originally going to use the 750 cc Reliant engine that was currently fitted to the Reliant Robin but after driving prototypes, it was soon decided the 750 cc 32 hp (24 kW) engine was not acceptable, so it was decided to tune the engine; but after engineers researched this they found that by changing the crank and rods the 750 cc engine could become a 850 cc engine without changing the liners or pistons, which again saved production costs. This new engine 850 cc engine developed 40 hp (30 kW) and could also be used in the Robin as an upgrade.

The chassis design of the Kitten from mid section backwards is essentially the same as that of the three-wheeled Reliant Robin using leaf springs and a solid rear axle, from the middle forwards the car is significantly different, with the engine moved forward and instead of using suspension from another manufacture Reliant-designed (but Lotus-inspired) double wishbone front suspension. Moving the engine forward increased driver and front passenger room, compared with the three-wheeled cars.

Prototypes of the Kitten were shown to the public in 1974 with some criticism that the Kitten looked like a "4 wheeled Robin" and because of this the car had a quick front end redesign with the round headlights replaced with the square lucas headlamps shared with the Austin Allegro and a black light panel and black bumpers front and rear. This earlier front end design would be used later on for Van models as the 7" round headlamps were significantly cheaper than the square lucas lamps.

The Kitten launched in 1975 as a Saloon and Estate model with a large range of optional extras and a choice of black or tan interiors, it was also one of the first small UK cars to be sold as standard with radial tyres.

In October 1976 a new de luxe version of the Kitten, branded as the Kitten DL, was announced. Improvements included revised springs and dampers and a different anti-roll bar. But mainly the DL model was an interior improvement package. It included more comfortable seats which reclined and tilted – and were available in brown or black cloth – a stronger door design with chrome interior handles, vinyl door cards incorporating map pockets, a parcel shelf, volt meter and oil pressure gauges. The car also had a radio with twin speakers, Gemini alloy wheels, additional carpets, front and rear fog lights and in some cases rear reversing lights, the biggest claim was the Kitten DL was the first UK small car to come with a rear wiper as standard, something car journalists noted at the time similar to the Kitten's bigger brother the Scimitar GTE.

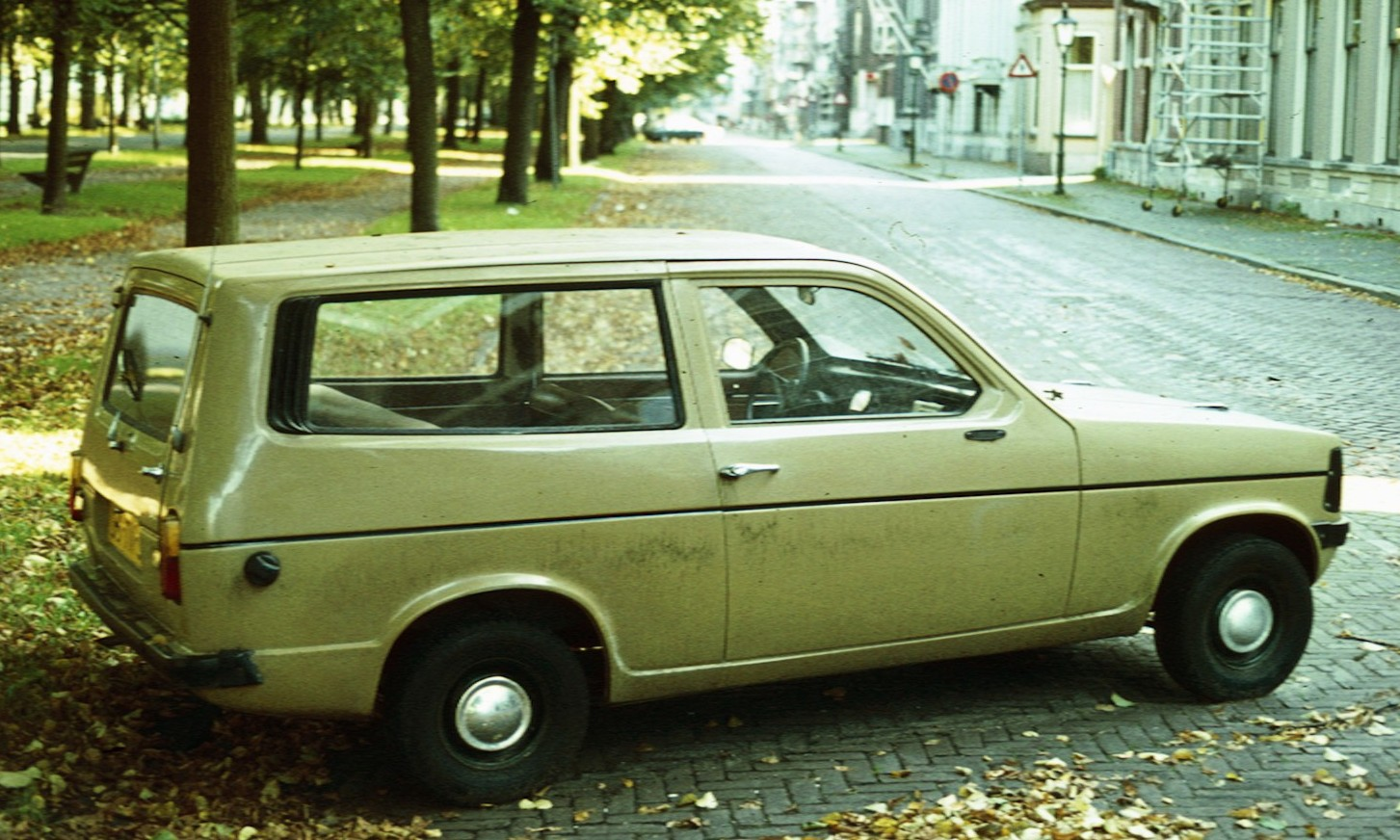
Reliant Kitten Estate

On 1 December 1977, a van version of the Kitten was announced. It shared the profile of the Kitten Estate but used the prototype nose of the original Kitten saloon, which had 7 in (180 mm) Lucas round headlamps. The new car had blank panels in place of the windows behind the B-pillar, thus making a van. Other changes included a black vinyl interior with an optional rear bench seat which folded flat. The van could be had with or without a front passenger seat. With the seat, the van had an interior volume of 43 cu ft (1,200 L); without the seat, volume increased to 53 cu ft (1,500 L). A number of the vans "ended up with windows fitted as it was cheaper to buy [the van] than the estate".

After production problems with the Robin caused a drop in sales and loss of staff, Reliant decided to close down the Kitten production line and focus on Robin production, this meant after 1978 the Kitten became a "special order" vehicle only. If a customer wanted a Kitten they would now need to order at a Reliant dealer and wait for the car to be built by taking staff off the Robin production line, it also meant Kittens were no longer made in general batches and kept in stock at dealers.

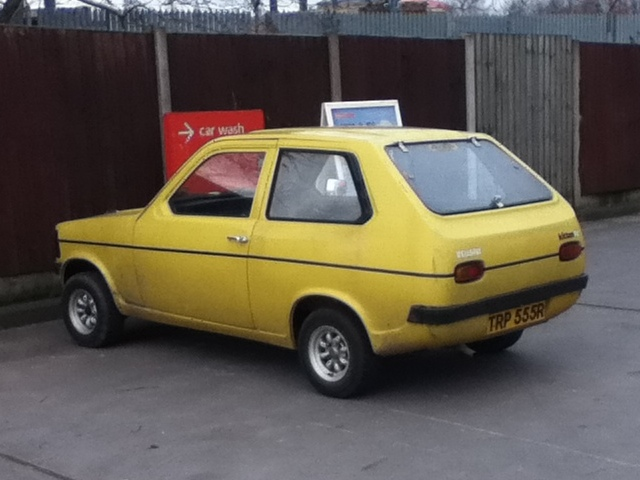
Reliant Kitten saloon

In 1982, after selling 4551 Kittens, "small numbers" of which had been built in left hand drive for export, the last Kitten rolled off the production line. It was "not replaced" by a new car but "The all new Reliant Fox" went into production in 1983. The Fox had similar mechanicals to the Kitten, but was a four-wheeled pickup with hard tops available to also make it into an estate or van type vehicle.

A number of Kittens were still sold in 1983 and 1984 from dealer built kits, lots of spares were left in stock at Reliant and since the Reliant Fox used the same chassis as the Kitten a number of vehicles were built by dealers for customers as the Fox didn't appeal to the same market since it was a van, these cars are easy to spot as they use the Fox's 12 inch wheels and are usually registered on Q registration plates.

Though Reliant had ended production of the Kitten in the UK it was expected to sell the imported Sipani Dolphin in the UK but this plan was quickly scrapped after Reliant saw the quality of the vehicles Sipani was producing.

== The Sipani Dolphin and Montana ==
1982 was not the end of production of the Kitten, though, as large numbers were built as CKD kits in Bangalore by Sipani Automobiles Ltd. Renamed the Dolphin, these cars had only slight changes, such as front grille and wheel trims. However, two-door cars were not particularly popular in India as laws restricted the sale of such vehicles in half of the country. As a result, Sipani produced the Montana, a larger five-door hatchback with a more modern appearance. The cars were successful rally cars in India and were seen as a popular home-grown choice of vehicle. Sipani carried on producing vehicles built around the Kitten design and mechanicals into the 1990s.

A preservation society exists called the Reliant Kitten Register.

== Journalists impressions ==
Classic and Sportscar magazine noted that the car's 80 mph (130 km/h) speed and 45 mpg_{‑imp} (6.3 L/100 km) fuel economy gave it real kitten-like performance, with a taxi-like 23 ft (7.0 m) turning circle" but that it was more expensive than rival cars from other manufacturers, which could build larger numbers of vehicles. In a letter to the editor of Motorsport magazine in 1976, a Dr Robert Elliot-Porter wrote that he had driven his Kitten on an 80 mi (130 km) round-trip on a motorway and averaged 81.5 mph (131.2 km/h). He called it "a car of which the British can be proud," adding that he had driven his Kitten more than 25,000 mi (40,000 km) in 10 months of ownership. Both he and his wife owned Kittens. Automotive writer Craig Cheetham opined that Reliants in general appealed to "the older generations among Britain's population" because of the car's durability and that "the average buyers" of the Kitten "were well into their sixties".
