= Reliant Sabre =

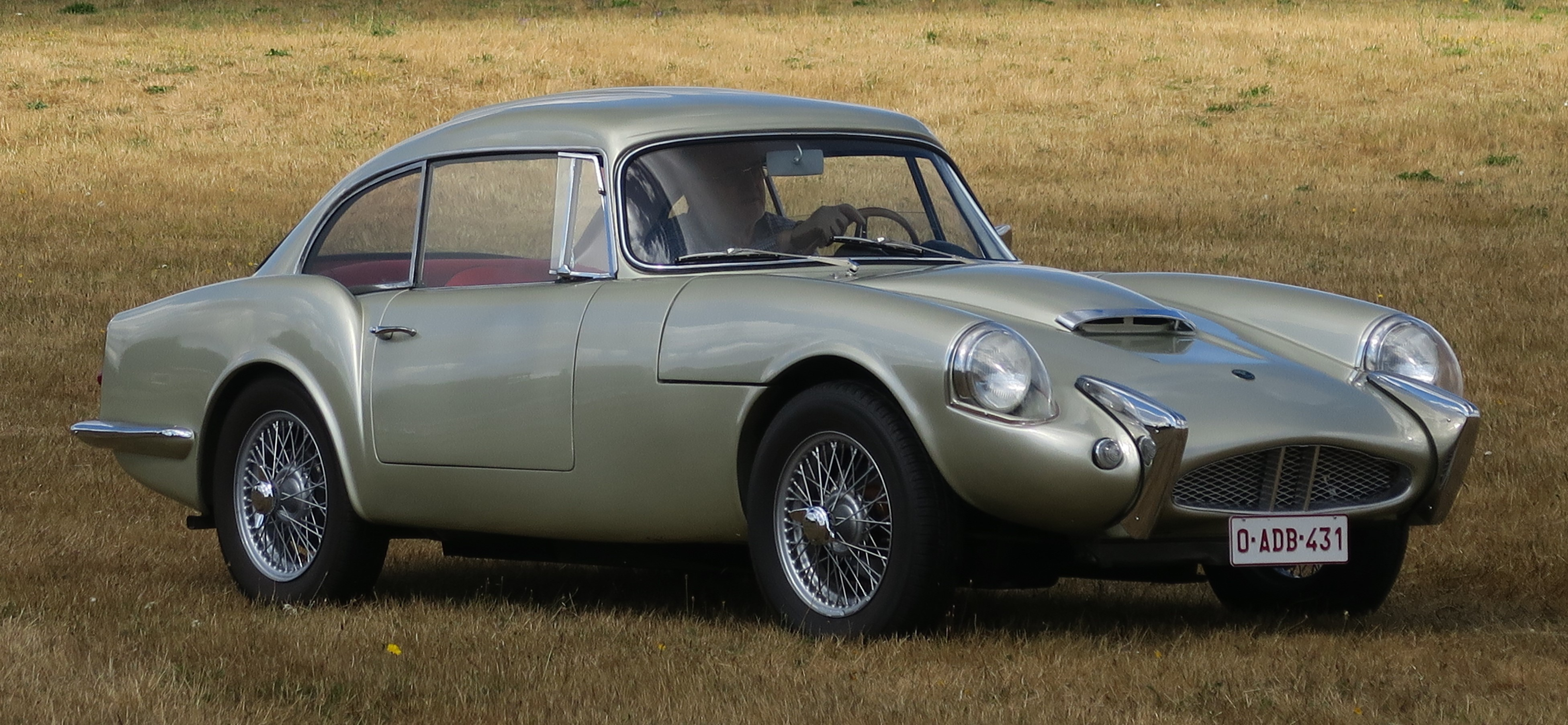

Overview
- Manufacturer: Reliant
- Also called: Autocars Sabra
- Production: 1961–1964
- Assembly: United Kingdom: Tamworth, England

Body and chassis
- Class: Sports car
- Body style: 2-door convertible; 2-door coupé
- Layout: FR layout

Chronology
- Predecessor: Reliant Sabra
- Successor: Reliant Scimitar

The Reliant Sabre (also "Sabre Four") and the Reliant Sabre Six were small two-seater sports cars produced by Reliant between 1961 and 1964.

== History ==
Developed in collaboration with the Israeli motor company Autocars, as a result of the Managing Director Itzhak Shubinsky visiting the 1960 London Racing Car Show, where he saw the Ashley 1172 fibreglass body and also a Leslie Ballamy-designed chassis, the EB Debonair, exhibited on the LMB Components stand. Autocars obtained licences for both parts and contracted Reliant to develop the Sabra for Autocars. Reliant introduced a right-hand drive version for the UK market and renamed it the Sabre. At Reliant, David Page redesigned the chassis and the bodyshell was redesigned by Eddie Pepall to meet US requirements. Launched in 1961 as two-door convertibles, front-engined, rear-drive, with four-cylinder OHV, Ford Consul (later "Zephyr 4") engines of 1,703 cc (103.9 cu in). They had front disc brakes, rack and pinion steering, and a ZF all-synchro gearbox. The front suspension was an unusual leading-arm set-up. Power output was 73 bhp (54 kW) giving at least 90 mph (140 km/h).

Coupés were introduced in June 1962, and total production reached 208 cars. At Earls Court in October 1962 the Sabre was shown with a redesigned, "less bizarre" front end. A six-cylinder Super Sabre SE2 prototype was also shown, which then became the Sabre Six.

In 1962, the Reliant Sabre Six was introduced, with a 109 bhp (81 kW) six-cylinder Ford engine of 2,553 cc (155.8 cu in), capable of 110 mph (180 km/h) and 0-60 mph in 12.2 seconds. The nose of the car was different from the earlier Sabres, and all but the first 17 Sabre Sixes had more conventional suspension, taken from the Triumph TR4. From a production total of 77, 75 were coupés and just two were convertibles. The Reliant competitions department modified three factory cars and three privateer cars for entry into a number of International rallies. Modifications included a Raymond Mays alloy head with triple twin-choke Weber carburettors and independently-branched exhaust manifolds. Between 1963 and 1965, the cars participated in the Alpine Rally, RAC Rally, Welsh Rally and Monte Carlo Rally.

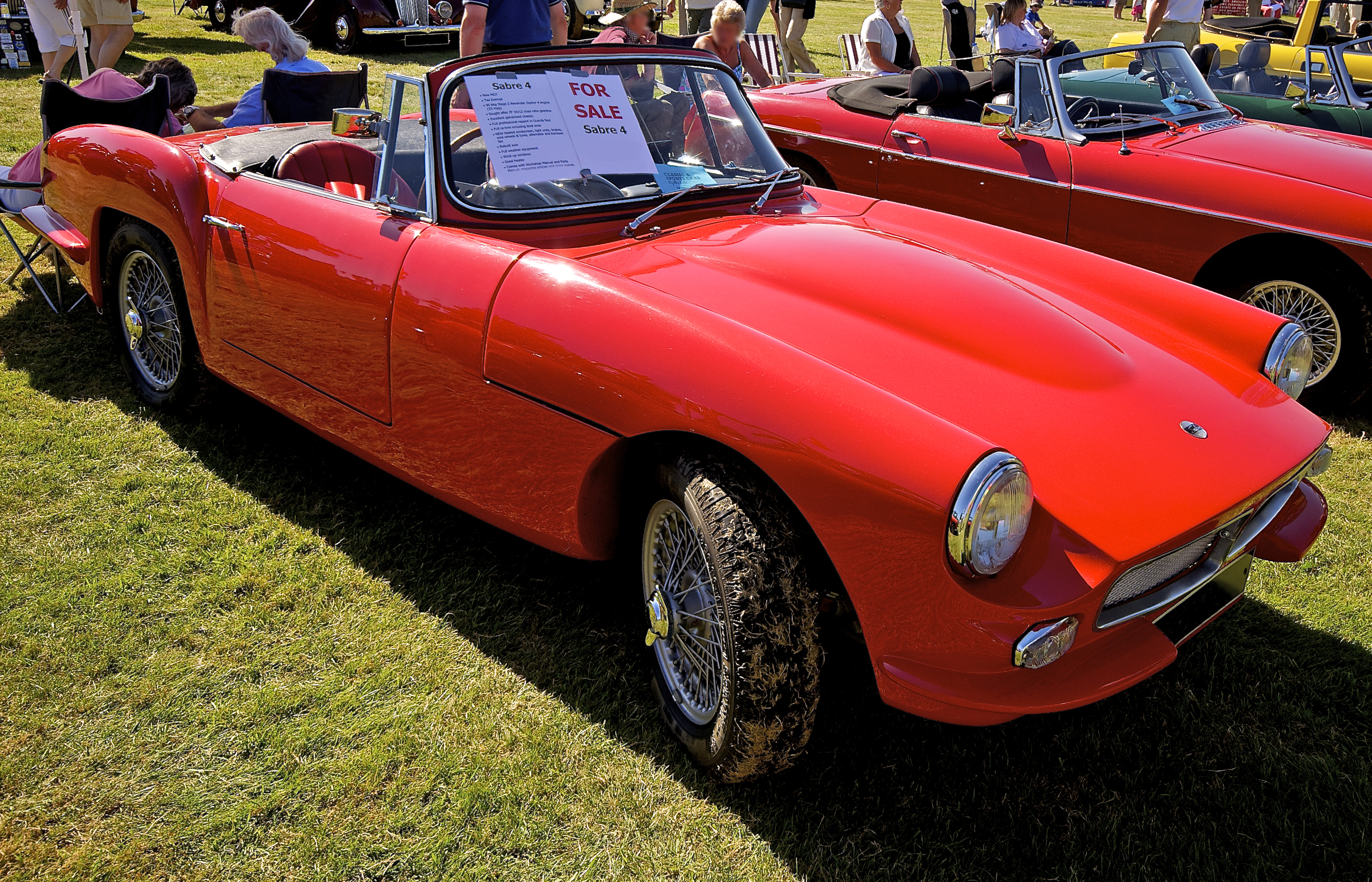
1964 Sabre Four

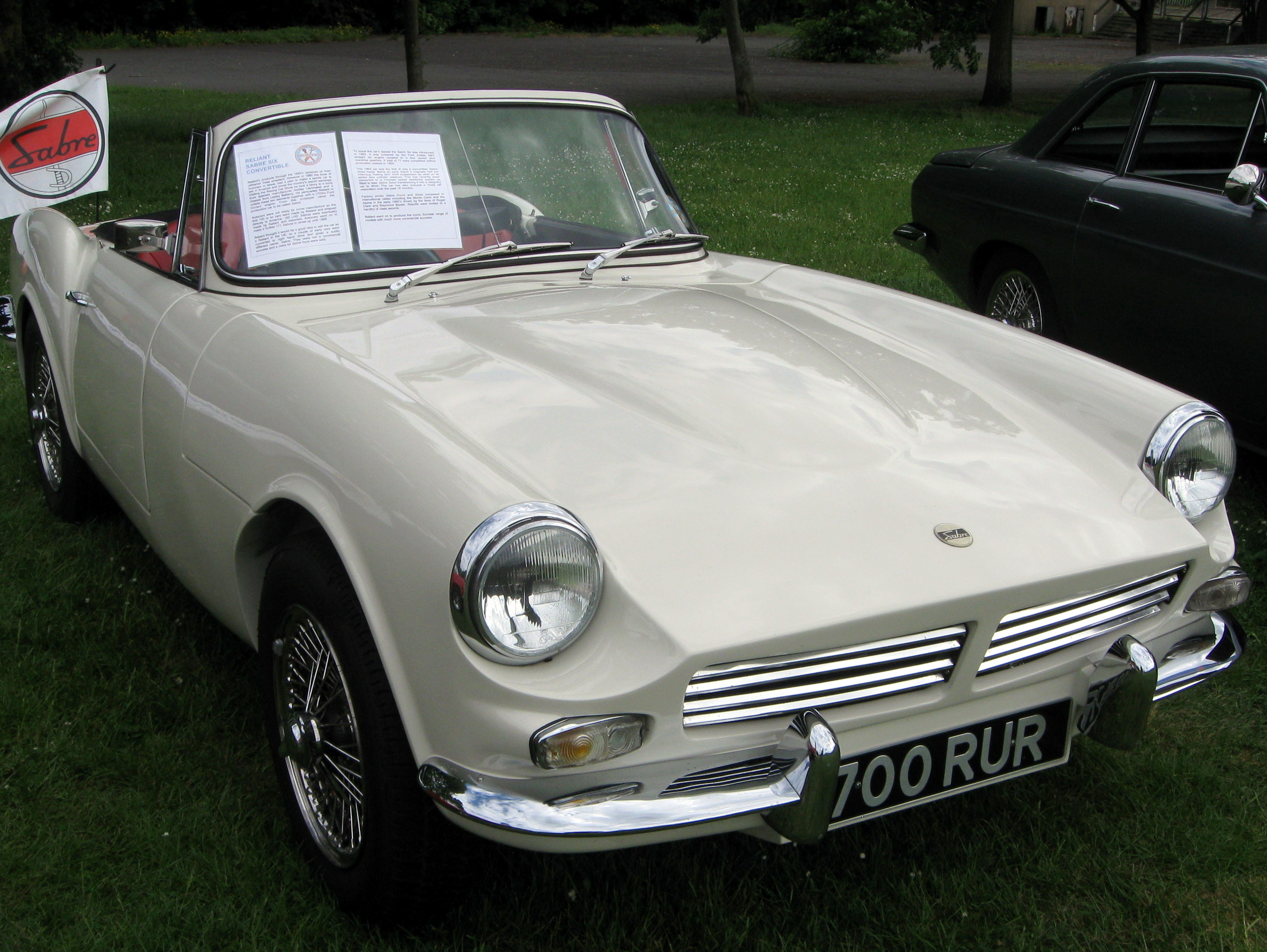
1964 Reliant Sabre 6

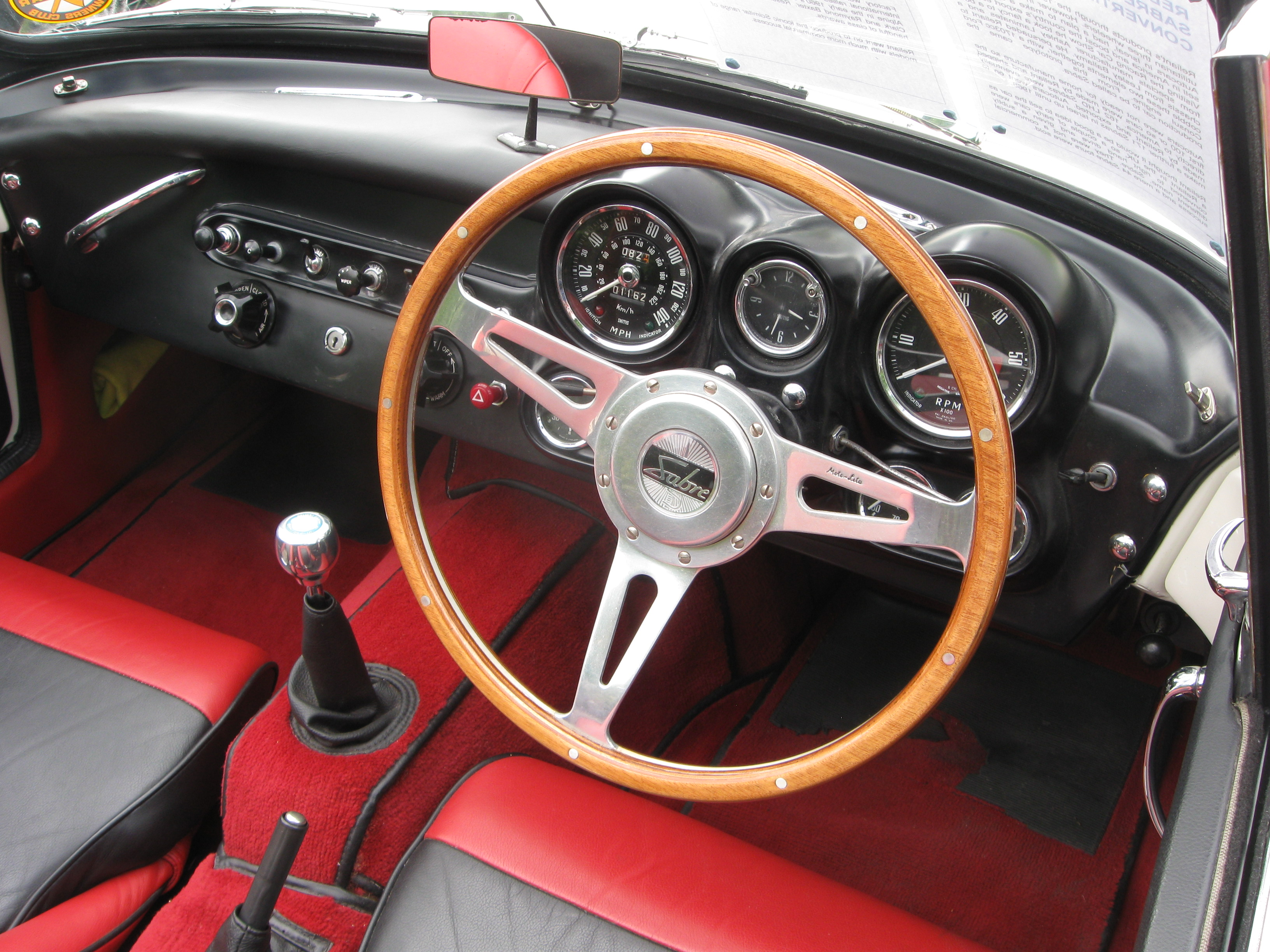
1964 Reliant Sabre 6 interior

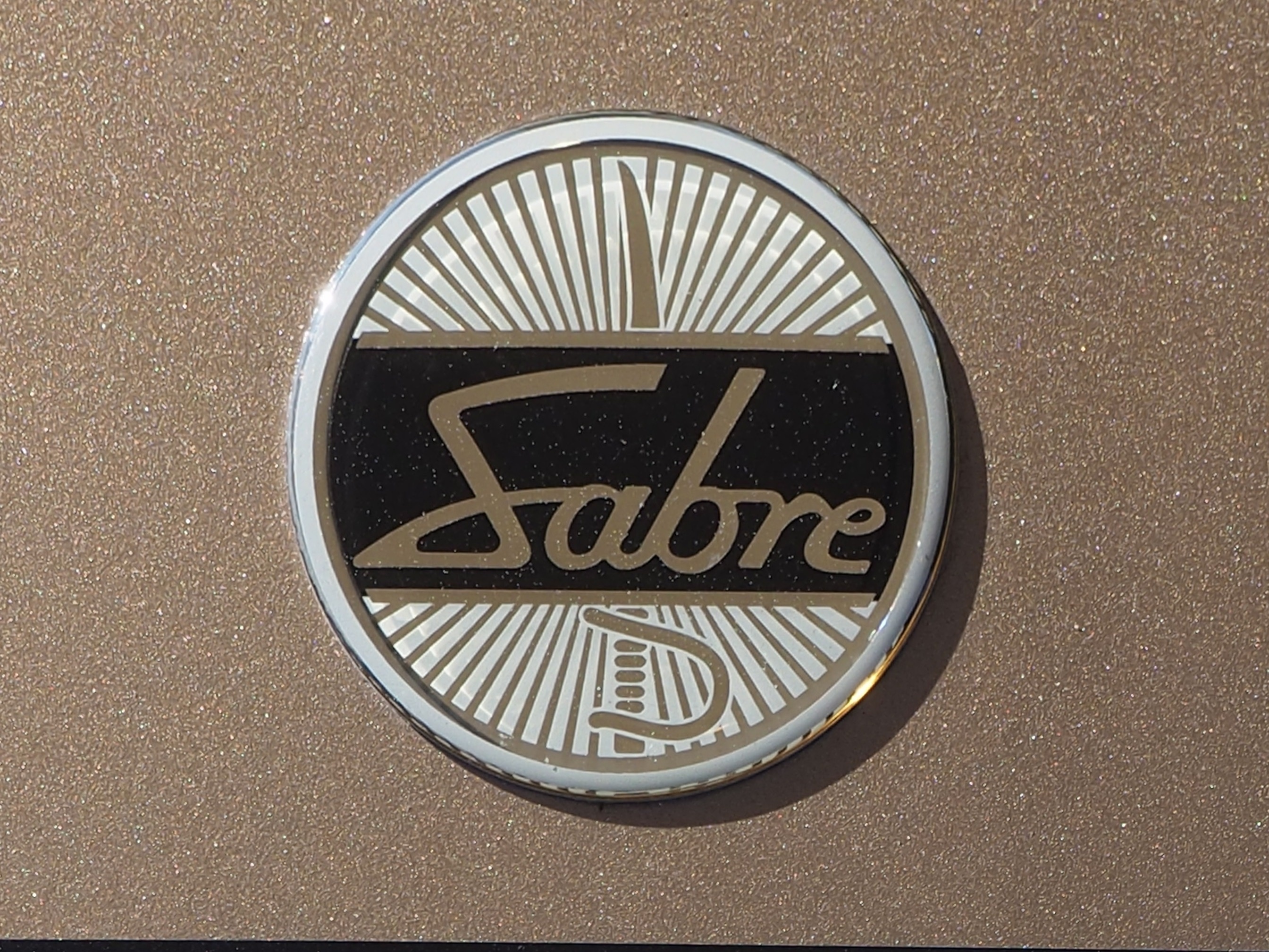
Badge

== Appearances in films and books ==
- Modesty Blaise had a Sabre Six in the book I Lucifer.
