= Reliant Motors =

British car manufacturer in Tamworth, Staffordshire

Reliant Motor Company
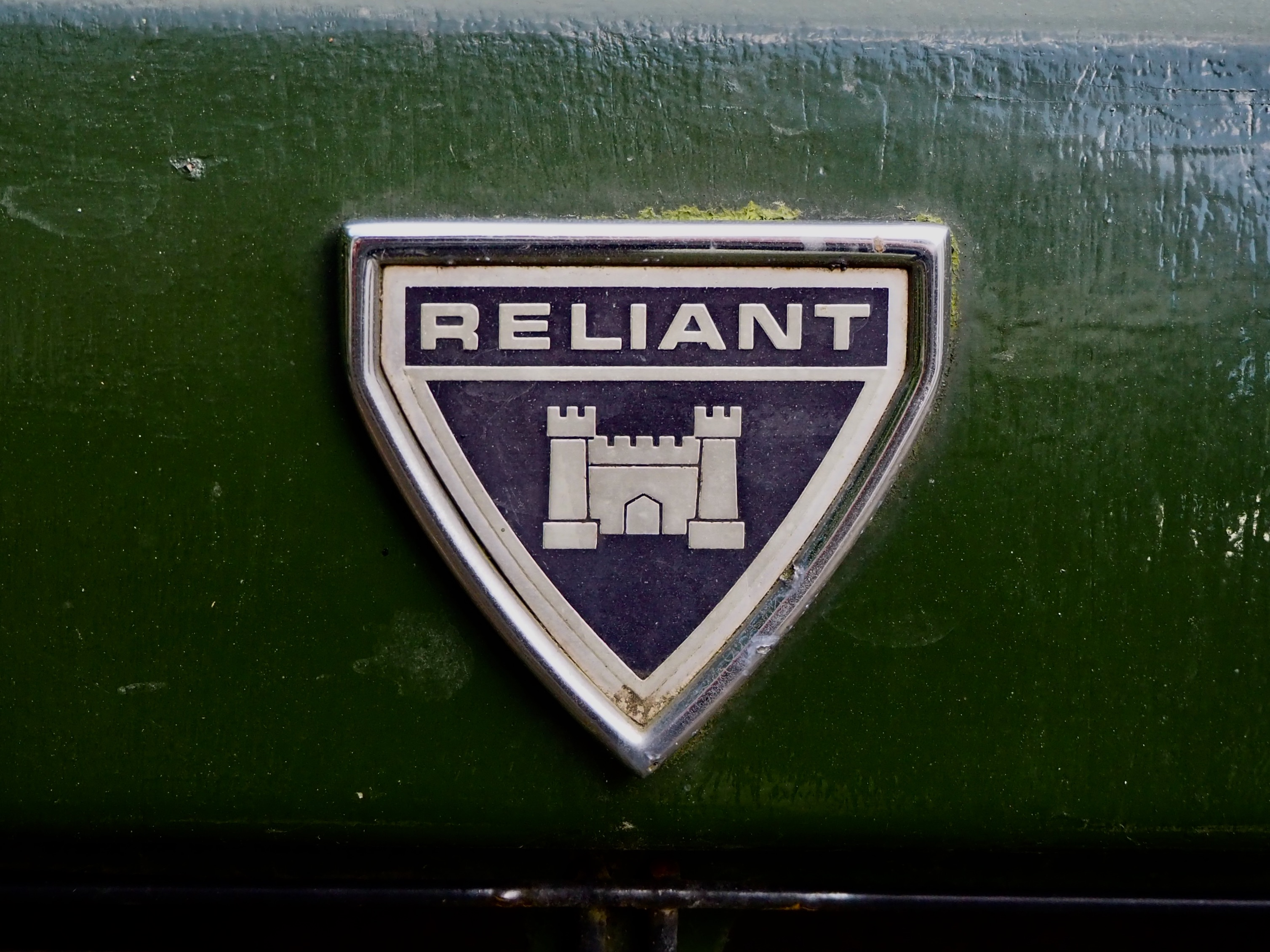
- Badge used by Reliant Motors

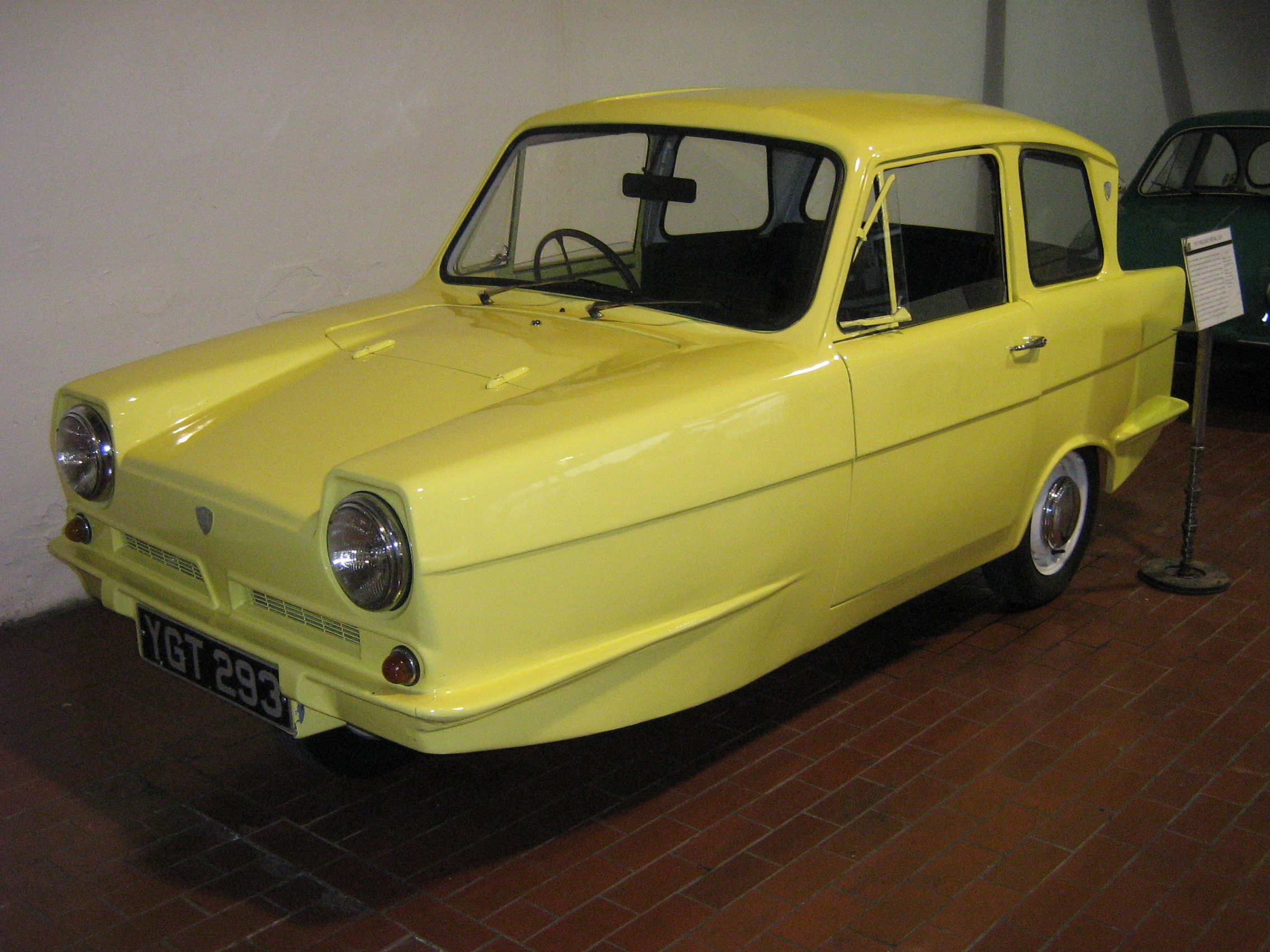
- 1971 Reliant Regal
- Industry: Automotive
- Founded: 1935
- Founders: Tom Williams, Eddie Thompson,
- Defunct: 2002
- Fate: Ending of car production
- Headquarters: Tamworth, England
- Products: Cars, vans, pickup trucks
- Parent: Hodge International (1962–1977); Nash Group (1978–1990); Bean Industries (1989–1994)
- Website: www.reliantpartsworld.co.uk (defunct)

Reliant Motor Company was a British car manufacturer based in Tamworth, Staffordshire, England. It was founded in 1935 and ended car production in 2002, the company had been known as "Reliant Motor Company" (or RMC for short) until the 1990s when it became "Reliant Motors" and then finally became "Reliant Cars LTD" after production had ended of the Robin as the company was restructured to be a car import business. It is now a dormant company and the only entity left is a separate parts company created called "Reliant Partsworld" which produces parts for Reliant vehicles.

Reliant was a large manufacturing company that mainly produced vehicles for niche markets, such as small three-wheeled vehicles and sports cars. It was best known for the three-wheeled Reliant Robin, but produced a variety of vehicles over 60 years, including sports cars, convertibles and commercial vehicles. Approximately half a million Reliant vehicles were produced and sold in at least nine countries. For a period from the 1970s until the 1990s, Reliant was the UK's second biggest British-owned car manufacturer behind British Leyland.

To make their vehicles light, the company decided to produce car bodies from fibreglass in the mid-1950s. From this, Reliant became a pioneer in fibreglass design, techniques, and developments. Reliant also produced kitchen worktops, train bodies, and personal watercraft shells from fibreglass. In the 1970s, Reliant was the largest producer of fibreglass in Europe.

== Company history and car production ==
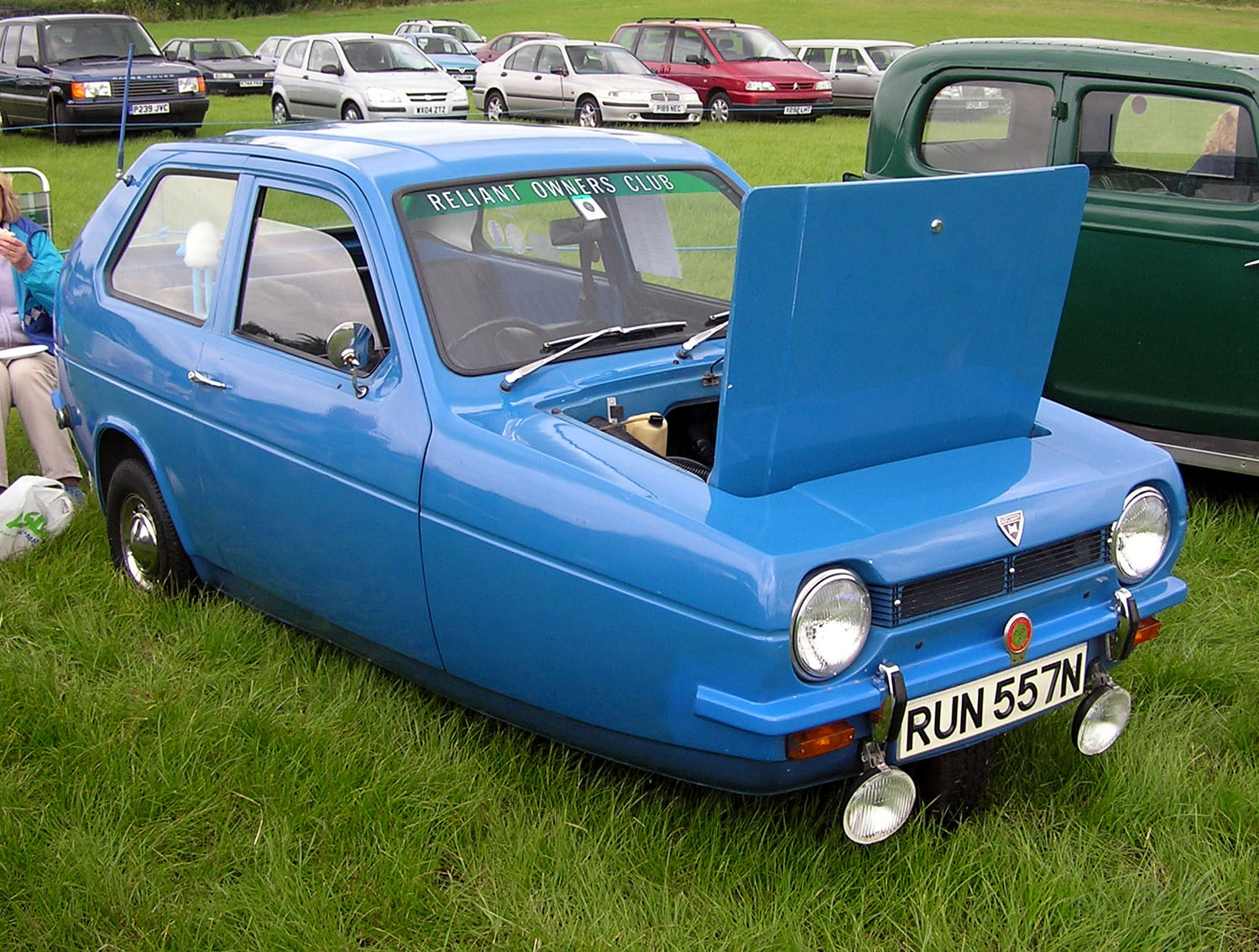
1974 Reliant Robin

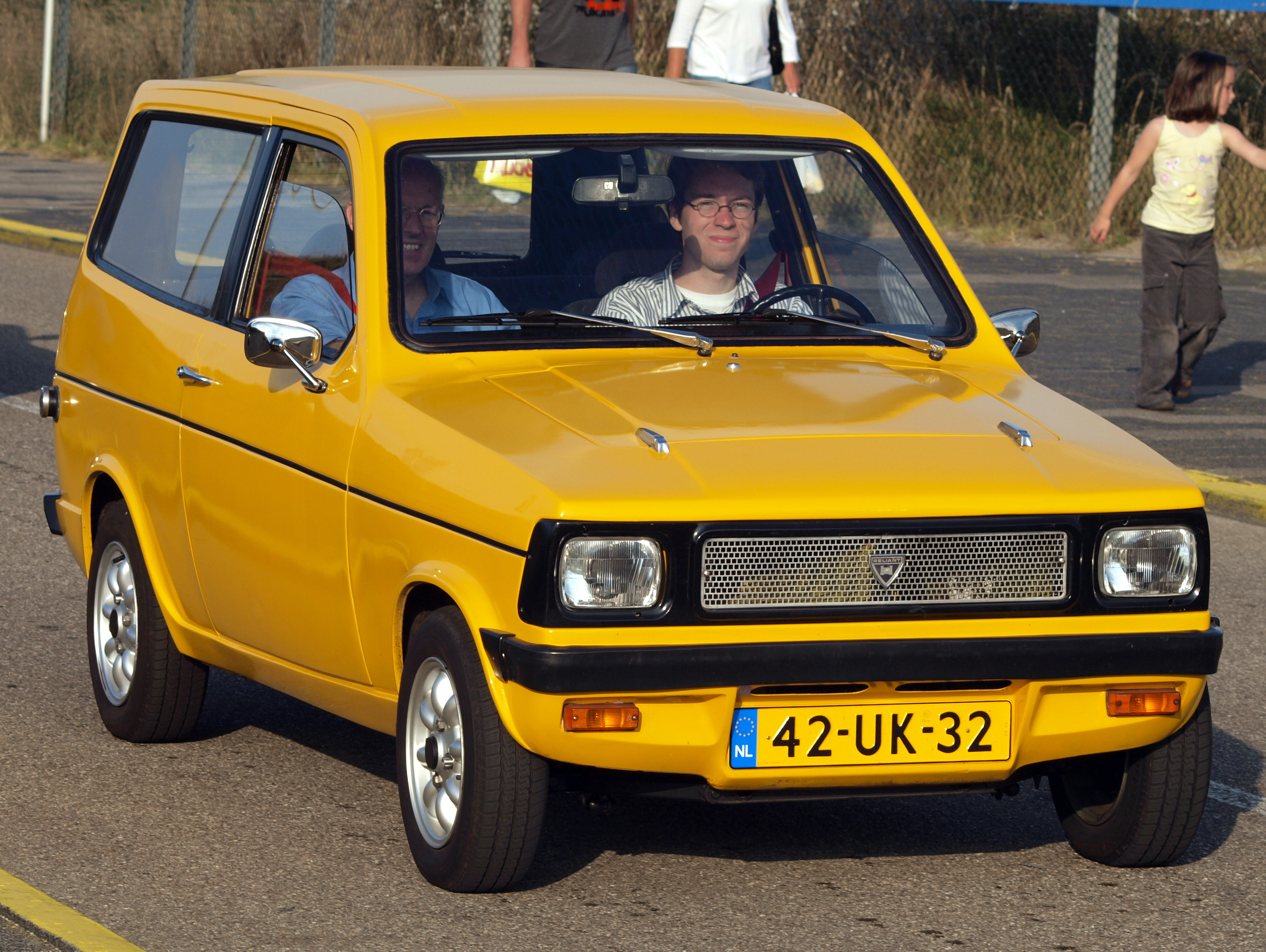
Reliant Kitten estate

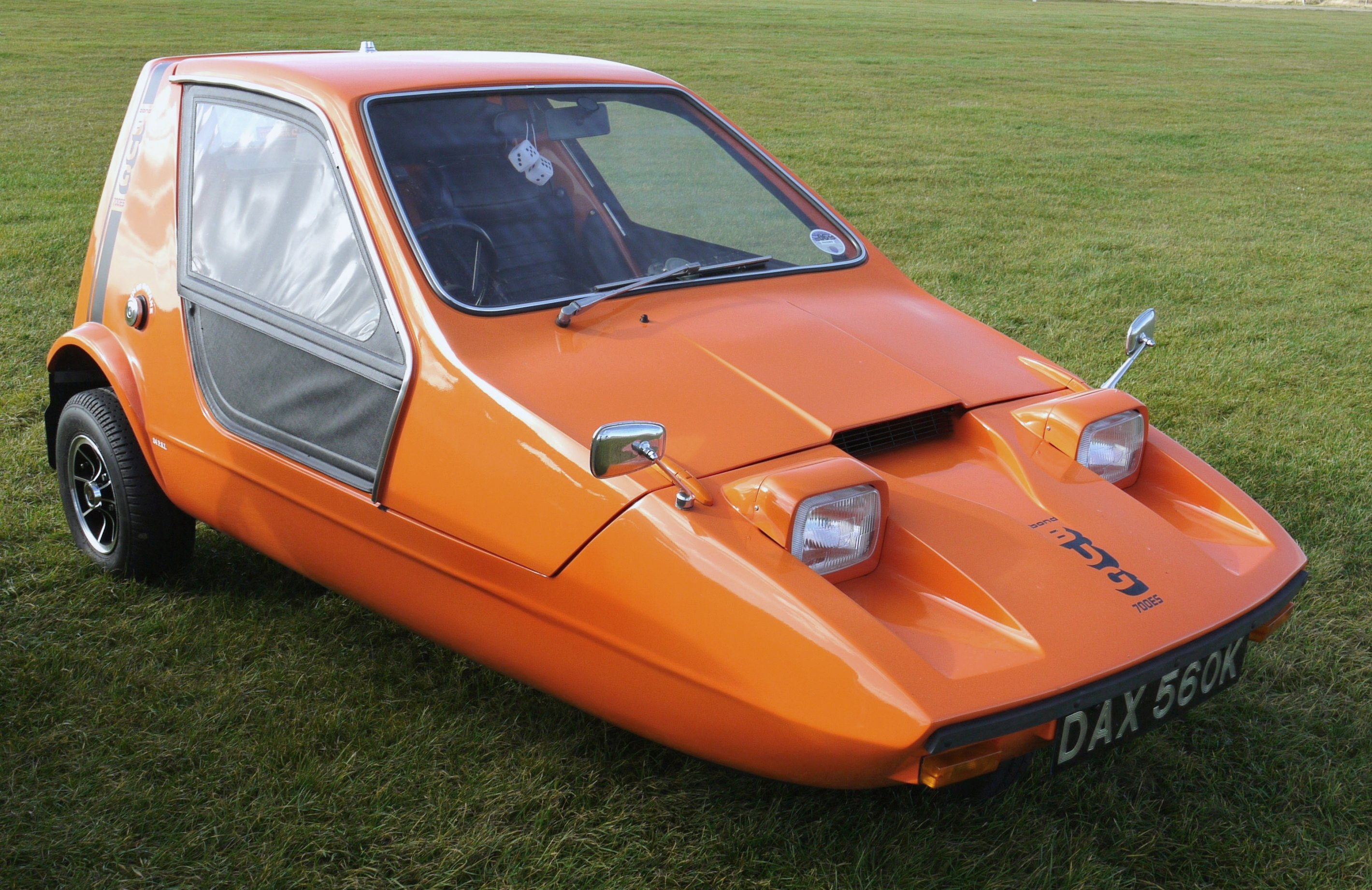
Bond Bug

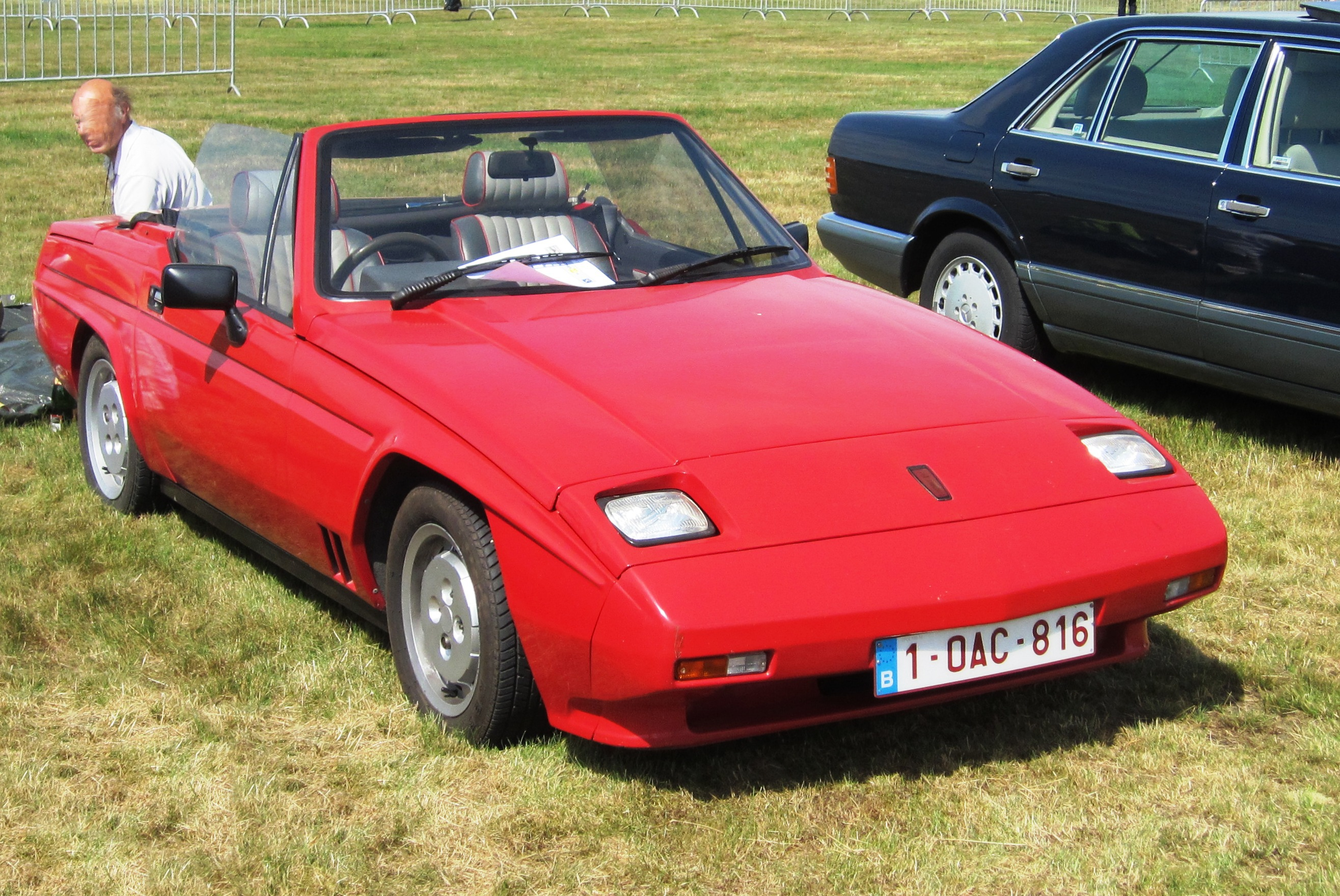
Reliant Scimitar SS1

=== First vehicles ===
When the Raleigh Bicycle Company decided to discontinue the manufacture of their three-wheeled vehicles in 1934, their works manager, T. L. Williams, and a colleague, E. S. Thompson, felt that the days of lightweight three-wheelers were not over. They decided to build their own vehicle in Williams's back garden on Kettlebrook Road in Tamworth. Their home-built design closely resembled the Karryall van previously built by Raleigh, and the prototype was licensed in January 1935. It was a 7 cwt (356 kg) van with a steel chassis, powered by a 600 cc single-cylinder engine driving the rear wheels through a three-speed gearbox and chain drive. The body was a hardwood frame with aluminium panels attached to it, like other cars of the time. With the motorcycle front end, mounted in the open, in front of the bulkhead, it was essentially a motorcycle fitted with a box body. The initial prototype had handlebars for steering, but after several trials with small local companies, it was changed to a steering wheel.

The work moved to a disused bus depot on Watling Street in Fazeley. On 3 June 1935, the first Reliant was delivered. Powered by a single-cylinder air-cooled 600 cc J.A.P. engine, the driver sat centrally on the vehicle astride the engine, much like a motorcyclist. The single-cylinder engine left the Reliant under-powered. In March 1936, a two-cylinder, water-cooled J.A.P. engine and an increase to 8 cwt (407 kg) gross vehicle weight was released. The driver no longer sat astride the engine and the vehicle gained more conventional forward-facing seats in the front. The first improved eight cwt twin-cylinder model was delivered on 16 March 1936.

In 1938, the Reliant Motor Company started to use the 10.5 hp, 747 cc four-cylinder Austin side-valve engine as found in the popular Austin Seven. The first four-cylinder Reliant was delivered on 12 March 1938. The Austin Car Company then announced its intention to cease production of the 747 cc Austin Seven engine. As Williams was always enthusiastic about making Reliant as independent as possible, he was keen that the company did not buy parts that it could make "in-house". Austin sold all the 747 cc engine tooling and manufacturing rights to Reliant, allowing them to commence manufacturing the engine. Although appearing very similar to the Austin engine, the level of commonality between Reliant and Austin remains unclear; the Reliant side-valve engine was a 747 cc four-cylinder unit built using smaller-scale manufacturing techniques than Austin. The Reliant crankcase was sand-cast rather than die-cast.

=== Postwar vehicles and advent of fibreglass ===
During the Second World War, Reliant machined parts for the war effort. In the post-war years, three-wheeler development continued. Reliant introduced a slightly modified van called the Regent. Visually similar to an over-sized motorcycle, the first Regent was completed on 13 March 1946, ten years after the first twin-cylinder van. The Regent grew to a GVW of 10 cwt and was better equipped, with sliding windows in the doors rather than canvas side screens. Two larger models were produced, a 12 cwt Regent and a Prince Regent. In 1953, the Regent continued to be built alongside the Reliant Regal. The Regent was eventually replaced by the Regal Mk II 5 cwt van in 1956.

In 1952, a four-seat car was launched, initially with an aluminium body, but panel by panel, the company substituted it with fibreglass, as their understanding of the material improved and the price of aluminium increased. By 1956, the bodywork of the Mark 3 version of the Reliant Regal had changed completely to fibreglass. The first generation of vehicles were designated Mk1 to Mk6, with each one getting improvements and slightly different styling. The car was originally powered by the 750 cc Austin Seven engine, originally manufactured by Austin Motor Company and later Reliant. Reliant's redesign of the engine gave it 17.5 hp (13.0 kW), which was a big improvement over the 10.5 hp of the 750cc Austin 7 design. Reliant was one of the last companies to produce a side-valve engine design, with the production of the Reliant 750 cc engine ending in 1962.

The 1963 Regal 3/25 had its body completely made of fibreglass. On previous generations of the Regal, the body was fibreglass, but the floor was made of bolted-together hardwood. Its engine was the first mass-produced lightweight overhead valve aluminium-alloy engine in Europe and the UK. Displacement was initially 598 cc on the Regal 3/25, but was later upgraded to 700 cc on the Regal 3/30.

=== Expansion ===
At the same time, Reliant were working for other countries to design vehicles for home-grown production. Vehicles would be sent over in kit form for the countries' own workforces to assemble. Reliant would first design the vehicle to the country's or company's requirements. The first was the Anadol in Turkey, which was based on a mix of Ford parts and a custom chassis. The Anadol began as a two-door saloon, then a four-door saloon, followed by commercial pickup and van versions. The pickup was produced until the early 1990s.

A similar vehicle was the Israeli Sabra Sport, also based on a Ford engine and running gear. Reliant was so impressed with the design, they sold it in the UK as the Sabre to help Reliant's company image expand beyond a three-wheeled micro-car maker. The car sold poorly against offerings from Triumph and MG, however.

Later, Reliant bought a prototype design for the replacement Daimler Dart, which became the Scimitar coupe and later the best-selling sporting estate—the Scimitar GTE.

To power the Scimitar GT coupe and Sabre, Reliant turned towards Ford of Britain and were supplied with the Zephyr 6 and Consul 4 engines. The coupe GT could be purchased with either the 2.5 litre or the 3.0 litre Essex V6 engine. Later, 3.0 GTEs were fitted with Essex V6 engines and gearboxes. On the 3.0 V6 GTE, the back axle ratio changed depending on the use of either a straight four-speed gearbox or one with an overdrive unit.

Reliant bought out Bond Cars in 1969 after Bond had gone into liquidation. Reliant purchased Bond after wanting to enter Triumph dealerships. Bond's Equipe sports car already had this agreement, but Triumph entered British Leyland and the deal ended. It is said that Bond was Reliant's main competitor in three-wheeled vehicles, with the Bond Minicar and the Bond 875, but Reliant's vehicles outsold Bond's in huge numbers, with a much larger production and dealer network. Reliant did use the Bond name for the 1970s Bond Bug, which was a Reliant prototype originally named the Reliant Rogue. The Bug was a sporty three-wheeler designed by Ogle designer Tom Karen. The Bug used a shortened Reliant Regal chassis and other mechanical parts, but many parts, such as the front swingarm, were new designs that would also be used on the 1973 Reliant Robin. The Bond Bug came in 700, 700E and 700ES models until replaced by the 750 model.

Reliant built four-wheeled versions of their three-wheeled stablemates – the first was the Reliant Rebel, which had three-quarters of the rear chassis design of the Regal, but front suspension based on the Triumph Herald with Reliant's own steering system. The engines were the same 600 cc and 700 cc units used in the Regal, but with a higher compression ratio and more torque because of the extra weight the Rebel carried over the Regal. The last model came with the 750 cc version when the Mk1 Reliant Robin was introduced. The styling of the Rebel was intended to make the car look unique so it did not seem like a four-wheeled version of the Regal; the Rebel came in saloon, estate and van models.

The Reliant Kitten was the four-wheeled version of the 1970s Reliant Robin, designed to replace the Rebel and featuring the 850 cc version of Reliant's own engine, which was introduced in 1975 (with the Reliant Robin gaining the engine shortly afterwards). The design this time featured very heavily on the Reliant Robin with only the nose of the design being different, having square headlights and a black panel around them – this was done mainly for cost-saving reasons so the parts from both vehicles could be shared for production.

After Reliant Kitten production stopped in 1982, the rights were sold to Sipani Automobiles in India who made the vehicle near-exactly the same, but with the name Sipani Dolphin. Later, the vehicle became a 4-door hatchback called the Sipani Montana. The car was built well into the 1990s with exactly the same Kitten mechanical. Reliant exported engines they had built for their own vehicles in the UK.

Between 1983 and 1990, a utility/pickup vehicle called the Reliant Fox was produced in the UK. This was based on an original development by Reliant to design a vehicle for the Greek company MEBEA. It was based on Reliant Kitten mechanical with its own pickup body and canvas top design. It had originally been built in Greece by MEBEA between 1979 and 1983. After production finished in Greece, Reliant decided to build it in the UK, but gave the Fox many design changes, including 12-inch wheels, altered suspension and the high compression 850 cc engine. They designed a rear hardtop to make the vehicle into a van or estate. Tandy Industries used Foxes as a basis for a compact, two-berth camper-van.

Reliant also made a small three-wheeled commercial vehicle called the Reliant TW9, later sold by other companies as the Ant (and, like the Robin, licence-built in Greece by MEBEA), which was a chassis and cab, onto which a custom rear body was fitted: a road sweeper, a flat back, a van, a milk float and hydraulic lifting rear bed version were common fitments. Also, a fifth wheel (actually fourth wheel) articulated tractor unit was created to pull large trailers. It was often used by public utility companies or more commonly sold to councils, where its ability to negotiate narrow alleyways was a big advantage.

Reliant's expertise in the area of composite car body production also saw the company produce lightweight bodyshells for Ford RS200 rally cars and a fibreglass-bodied taxi, the MetroCab – the first to have full wheelchair provision (manufactured by a division of Kamkorp after 2001), they also made Ford fibreglass truck cabs and Ford Transit hightops. With Reliant's expertise in fibreglass, the company created bodies for trains, kitchen worktops and boat/jet ski hulls.

Reliant's main business was selling three-wheeled vehicles. The main market these would sell to would be a motorcyclist who didn't wish to pass their full car licence test. It was a sizable niche market due to the large number of motorcyclists present and it lasted until 2001 when the EU eliminated the B1 class from being issued with a full motorcycle licence (the B1 allowing the holder to drive a three or four-wheeled vehicle up to the weight of 550 kg [1,210 lb]). The change capped Reliant's market share.

=== End of car production ===
The Hodge Group bought the majority of Reliant in 1962, selling it 15 years later to Kettering-based investment group J.F. Nash Securities. Nash Securities acquired the company for a below market price, equalling 76.6 percent of the value of the company shares. During the early 1990s, the owner of Reliant was a major housing developer and when the 1992 recession hit, the company folded and Reliant was sold to Beans Engineering. By 1996, Jonathan Haynes took the lead and his main backer took control. Haynes went on to create a new range of Robin and Rialto specifications to appeal to more customers, including more luxurious models such as the SLX. Sales doubled as previously most Reliant vehicles were basic, with not even the option of metallic paint.

In 1997, production was relocated to Plant Lane, Burntwood, following a major redesign of the Robin model in 1998. The new model featured all new panels and was essentially a 'heavy facelift' designed by Andy Plumb. Research continued into four-wheeled Reliant models such as a Kitten for the modern age. Prototypes for this featured in many newspapers and magazines at the time. Production continued of the Robin model until 2001 when shareholders decided to import Ligier microcars and Piaggio Ape three-wheelers instead. Jonathan Haynes sold his shares and left the company before production ended because he wished to create an all-new four-wheeled Reliant model instead.

The last Reliant made was the Robin 65 a Reliant Robin in metallic gold to celebrate 65 years of car production. The vehicles had every optional extra and sold for £10,000 - 65 of these vehicles were built up to Valentine's Day 2001.

== Export markets ==
Reliant, in the early 1950s, agreed a deal in Israel to produce Regent vans in SKD form. Not long after this, Israel would ask Reliant for a four-wheeled vehicle design which could be built in Israel that was strong for their rough roads and could be used with a choice of van, pick up, and estate body styles. The car used a lot of Reliant's existing parts; basically converting a Regent into a four-wheeled vehicle. This vehicle would never be sold in the UK and called the Reliant Regent four 10 cwt van, this would be sold in Israel by Autocars limited but the vehicle renamed Sussita to make it seem a more homegrown car. In 1958 Reliant showed this vehicle extensively in the UK to demonstrate they could design more than just 3 wheeled vehicles but also only showed in LHD form as it was only an overseas model.

Building on this relationship Autocars would then set Reliant the challenge to design a peoples' car for their country, this car would later be named the Carmel. The Carmel was designed around the same time Reliant were designing its Regal 3/25 and somehow some of its design features rubbed off, the square styling with a reverse slant Ford Anglia rear window for one, the engine was also the 1100cc Ford Anglia unit, apart from the body many of the chassis and running gear was used from the Sussita. Reliant would later design the Sabra Sport using Ashley Laminates existing kit car designs which Reliant would redesign again to sell it in the UK market as the Reliant Sabre.

Reliant would continue designing vehicles for Autocars into the early 1970s when Autocars started to source parts from Standard-Triumph, severing ties with Reliant in the process. Autocars would end in the late 1970s and would plan to start a new company selling Reliant Kittens in Israel but this would not happen.

From this export started another as in 1962 a Turkish delegation visited Autocars in Israel and was impressed with its car production; Turkey would later instruct Reliant to design its own peoples' car. Through this deal Reliant designed the Anadol, a saloon vehicle using a GRP body, separate chassis and Ford running gear, this deal though would not just be for a vehicle design but to help Turkey create its whole car production from its factory, paint and production. The company would be named Otosan.

The Anadol would be designed into two-door saloon, four-door saloon, van, pick up and estate, several redesigns would keep the Anadol looking modern into the 1970s, later Otosan became more distant from Reliant as local content rose. Reliant offered in the 1980s again to redesign the Anadol even presenting a prototype but by this time Otosan believed it could go it alone and redesigned the vehicle itself, this wouldn't end well for Otosan with declining sales and eventually Otosan became a Ford assembly plant for Turkey producing the Ford Escort.

== Revival attempt ==
Shortly after Reliant announced that production of the Robin would cease, production rights for the Reliant Robin were sold to a Sudbury-based firm called B&N Plastics, which redesigned major parts of the car. A deal was done where Reliant would supply the mechanical parts of the Reliant Robin to B&N Plastics and then the fibreglass skills of B&N Plastics would be used to build the vehicle and sell it under its own name.

Production of the new Robin would begin in late 2001. The new car would be called the BN-1 Robin with no Reliant branding. The BN-2 model would be made with extras such as electric windows. The cost of the base model, the BN-1 Robin, was £10,000, but had all the features of the Robin 65, such as a leather interior. The BN-2 model had all these extras and more.

However, after 30 to 40 cars were produced, Reliant could not supply the mechanical parts of the Reliant Robin as they had decided to end production of the Reliant 850 cc engine, which meant that the BN-1 Robin would need a redesign to use a different engine if production continued.

B&N Plastics had already spent £100,000 on approving the Robin design so production could start. The company sought to find more investors to help fund further redesigns to keep the Robin alive but by early 2002, no investors were found and B&N Plastics ended its car production with over 200 orders unfulfilled. B&N Plastics ceased production in late 2002.

In later years, it was revealed that B&N Plastics were planning to fit a Japanese K-car 660 cc three-cylinder engine and five-speed gearbox to make the Reliant Robin more modern.

=== Final years ===
Reliant produced 50 vehicles a week until 2001, when it finished production of its own models to focus on importing French Ligier microcars and motorcycles as well as the Piaggio Ape range of commercial vehicles. A final version of the Reliant Robin was produced with leather seats, metallic gold paint, alloy wheels, walnut dashboard, and some other luxurious features, which retailed for £10,000. The car was made in the company's 65th year of production, and so was named the Reliant Robin 65.

Reliant Cars Ltd. was renamed Reliant Partsworld, and operates from the factory where the Robin was built.

The old site of Reliant Motors, in Tamworth, was turned into a housing estate named Scimitar Park, after the Reliant Scimitar that the company produced. A number of streets in the estate were named after Reliant models as well, such as 'Robin Close'.

== Other forms of manufacturing ==
Since Reliant would be known for building robust fibreglass vehicles, it would diversify into producing fibreglass items other than their own vehicles. It was showcased in the "World of Reliant" documentary, which was written and filmed by Reliant in the early 1980s to show how diverse the company had become from a small car company producing three-wheeled vehicles.

Other fibreglass products produced were items such as GRP sinks and kitchen worktops, GRP replacement car wings for metal vehicles, GRP guttering and tubes, GRP train carriage bodies for British rail, and GRP aircraft bodies.

Reliant also had many contracts with Ford to build fibreglass high roof tops for their Transit model. Vauxhall Motors would also contract Reliant to make their GRP body kits for the Chevette.

== Commemoration plaque ==
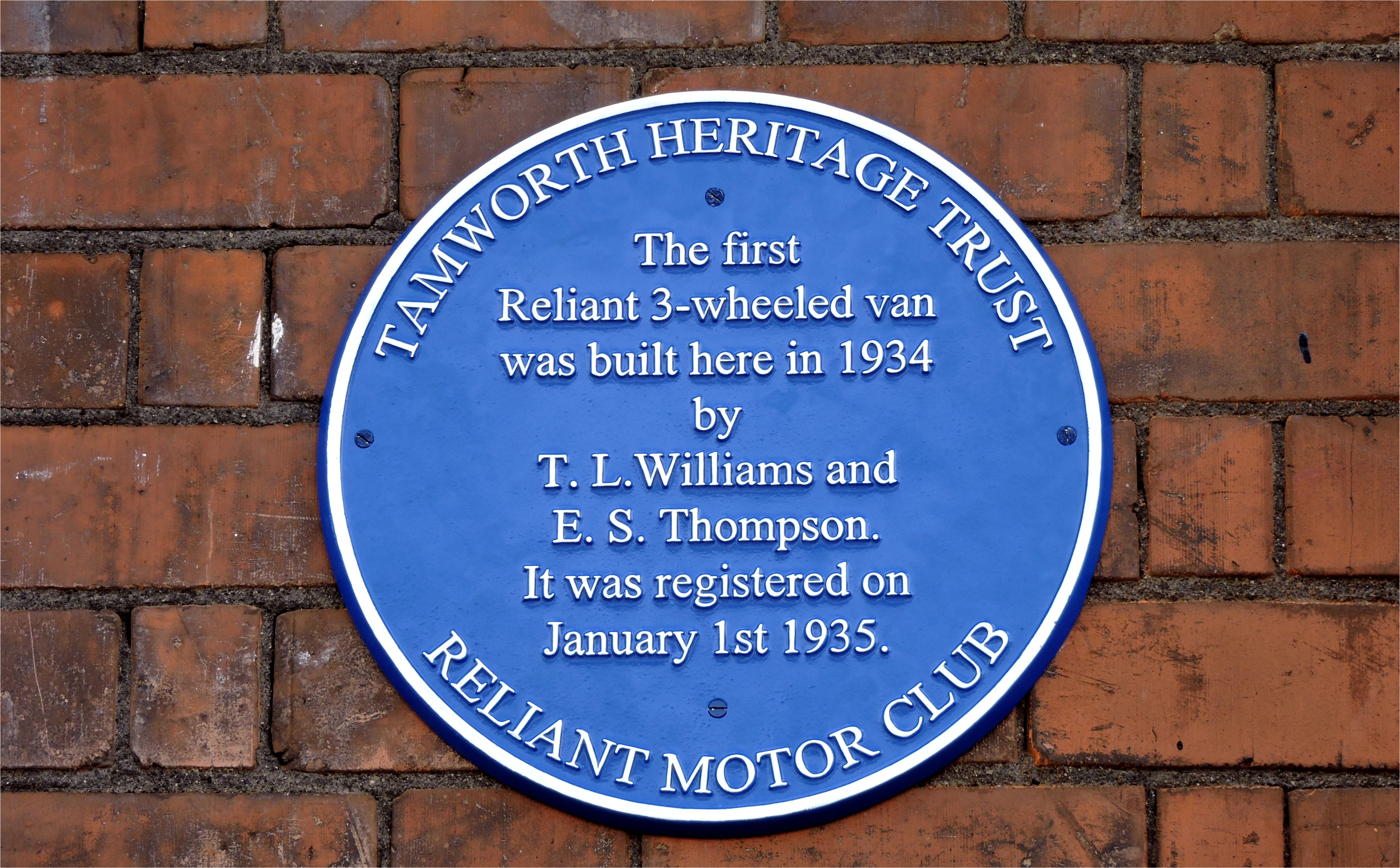
Reliant Blue Plaque

On 8 July 2017, a blue plaque was unveiled to honour both the founders, T. L. Williams and E. S. Thompson, and marked the birthplace of Reliant. The first Reliant prototype was built by Williams and Thompson in 1934, in the rear garden of Williams' residence, named Bro-Dawel, on Kettlebrook Road.

== Myths ==
The most widespread myth regarding Reliant vehicles is that they cannot go around corners. This was supposedly demonstrated on Top Gear, but Jeremy Clarkson admitted in The Sunday Times in 2016 that the Robin only rolled over frequently because the production team had welded the differential, fitted different sized rear wheels and placed heavy sandbags in the passenger footwell. As a result, the car became much less stable than before.

Another myth is that a Reliant, or any three-wheeled vehicle, is not allowed on British motorways. This is not the case. Any two-, three- or four-wheeled vehicle is allowed on the motorway as long as its engine size is over 50 cc (0.05 L) (with the exception of most agricultural vehicles).

It is a common misconception that the main character Derek "Delboy" Trotter in the British television comedy series Only Fools and Horses owned a Reliant Robin. Many people painted their Reliant Robins and Rialtos yellow with the famous "Trotters’ Independent Trading Co" lettering, but the Trotters' van was actually a Supervan III.

Many people are under the impression Reliant three-wheeler can be driven on a Compulsory Basic Training (CBT) licence, but they have engines larger than the CBT licence allows. To drive a Reliant, a full motorcycle or car licence is required and the driver must be over 21.

Another widely held myth was that all Reliant three-wheelers have no reverse gear; before 1964, the reverse gear would be disabled, but all Reliant vehicles were equipped with one.

== Licensing ==
Originally, to drive a three-wheeled vehicle on a motorcycle licence required passing a full motorcycle test and completing a restriction period. When the licence was issued it included a B1 class. This conferred the right to drive a vehicle with three or four wheels up to 550 kg (10¾ cwt), but the final B1 licences were issued in 2001. In January 2013, the licensing changed again. Drivers with a full A-category motorcycle licence who are over 21 years of age may drive a three-wheeled vehicle of any weight. The age restriction of 21 applies to full car licence holders also in the UK. Driving any Reliant three-wheeled vehicle is not legal on a CBT licence or lower.

== Models ==
Model	From	To	No. of wheels
7cwt, 10cwt	1935	1939	3
8cwt, 10cwt, 12cwt	1946	1950	3
Regent	1950	1956	3
Regal and Supervan III	1953	1973	3
Sabre	1961	1964	4
Scimitar GT	1964	1970	4
Rebel	1964	1974	4
FW5	1966	1975	4
TW9	1967	1987	3
Scimitar GTE/GTC	1968	1986	4
Robin	1973	2002	3
Kitten	1975	1982	4
FW11	1977	1977	4
Rialto	1982	1997	3
Fox	1982	1990	4
Scimitar SS1/SST	1984	1992	4
Scimitar Sabre	1992	1995	4

== See also ==
- List of car manufacturers of the United Kingdom

== Sources ==
- Pither, D (2001). Reliant Regal and Robin. Thrupp.
- Wotherspoon, N (1993). Lawrie Bond; the man and the marque. Minster Lovell.
- Armstrong, Aldridge, Boyes, Mustoe & Storey (2003). Companion to British Road Haulage History. NMSI Trading Science Museum. ISBN 1-900747-46-4.
- Payne, Elvis (2016). The Reliant Motor Company. Crecy Publishing.
