= Sipani =

Indian car manufacturer

Sipani Automobiles Ltd.
- Formerly: Sunrise Automotive Industries Ltd. (SAIL)
- Company type: Automobile manufacturer
- Industry: Automotive
- Founded: 1973
- Defunct: 2002
- Fate: defunct
- Headquarters: Bangalore, Karnataka, India
- Products: Automobiles

Sipani Automobiles Ltd. (known as SAIL [Sunrise Automotive Industries Ltd.] until 1978) was an Indian car manufacturer established in 1973, located in Bangalore. They mainly manufactured subcompact cars with fibreglass bodies. They also took over Auto Tractors Limited in 1991 and manufactured diesel engines and tractors in the old ATL factory in Pratapgarh, Uttar Pradesh.

Sipani's predecessor firm Sunrise Automotive Industries Ltd. (SAIL) was one of three companies to receive a very restrictive industrial license for automobile production in 1973. The license did not allow the prospective manufacturers to collaborate with foreign companies, or even to consult with them or import capital goods or components. Sanjay Gandhi was one of the other licensees, and even with extensive government support his Maruti project was unable to get off the ground until the government changed those conditions entirely. Nothing much has ever been heard regarding the third licensee, Manubhai Thakkar.

== Badal ==
In 1975, Sunrise Auto introduced the fibreglass-bodied Badal, India's first three-wheeled car. Production began in 1976. It was a three-door model that some claim was inspired by the Reliant Robin. The Reliant link is tenuous at best, with the little vehicle being essentially an auto rickshaw clothed in passenger car bodywork. The bodywork had an air of station wagon about it although it had no rear gate, as the engine was in the rear, and was also unusual in having two doors on the left and a single door on the right (driver's) side. The engine was a 198 cc single-cylinder two-stroke engine of Italian origin, producing 10 PS (7.4 kW). The chassis was a steel Y-frame, with the rear-mounted engine driving the rear wheels.

The Badal was not a success, and a four-wheeled version called "Badal 4" (sometimes referred to as the "Sail") replaced it in 1981. The Badal 4 had entirely different, more rectangular bodywork and a front-mounted engine but may never have entered actual production and was soon superseded by the Dolphin. Sunrise built 179 cars in 1977, which increased to 331 in 1978. This dropped to 104 in 1979 and 51 cars in 1980, followed by a mere 31 in 1981.

There was no involvement by Reliant until later when Sunrise Autos was approached by Reliant to produce Indian built variants of the Robin and Kitten after the failure of the Badal to sell.

== Dolphin ==
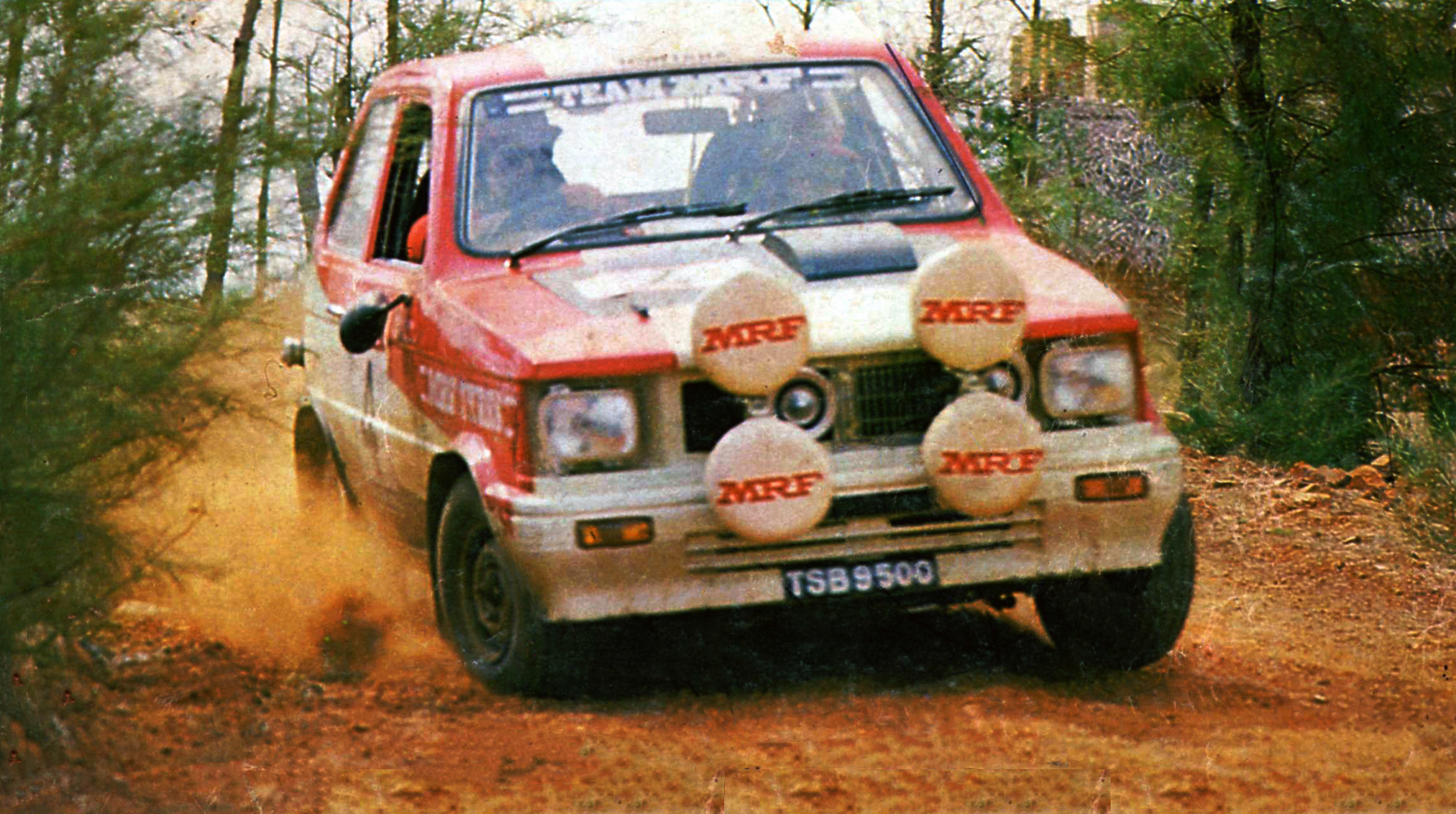
A Sipani Dolphin being rallied in 1987

Sipani instead switched to building a copy of the British four-wheeled, three-door Reliant Kitten under the name Sipani Dolphin. As with Sipani's earlier products, this too had fibreglass bodywork. This arrived in 1982, with Sipani stating that the first two years' production (6,000 cars) were already on order. The standard version of the Dolphin was light blue in colour. Power is 38 hp (28 kW) from the all-alloy 848 cc four-cylinder engine, also of Reliant construction, and the car weighed in at 505 kg (1,113 lb). Sipani also offered the two-door Estate bodywork as per the Kitten; this model was 2 centimetres longer and weighed in at 526 kg (1,160 lb).

Being light and comparably powerful by Indian standards of the day, the Dolphin became known as a fast car and saw some competition success in India. Sales, however, were less satisfying. Indian buyers were not fully confident in a plastic-bodied car and two-door cars have always had a very limited appeal in India. Although they had aimed to build 6,000 cars in two years, Sipani's total production in 1982 was 126 (this may have included a few Badals). 1983 production was 302, followed by 930 cars in 1984. Production amounted to 523 cars in 1985, which dropped to 55 cars in 1986 and 40 in 1987, the last year for the Dolphin.

== Montana ==
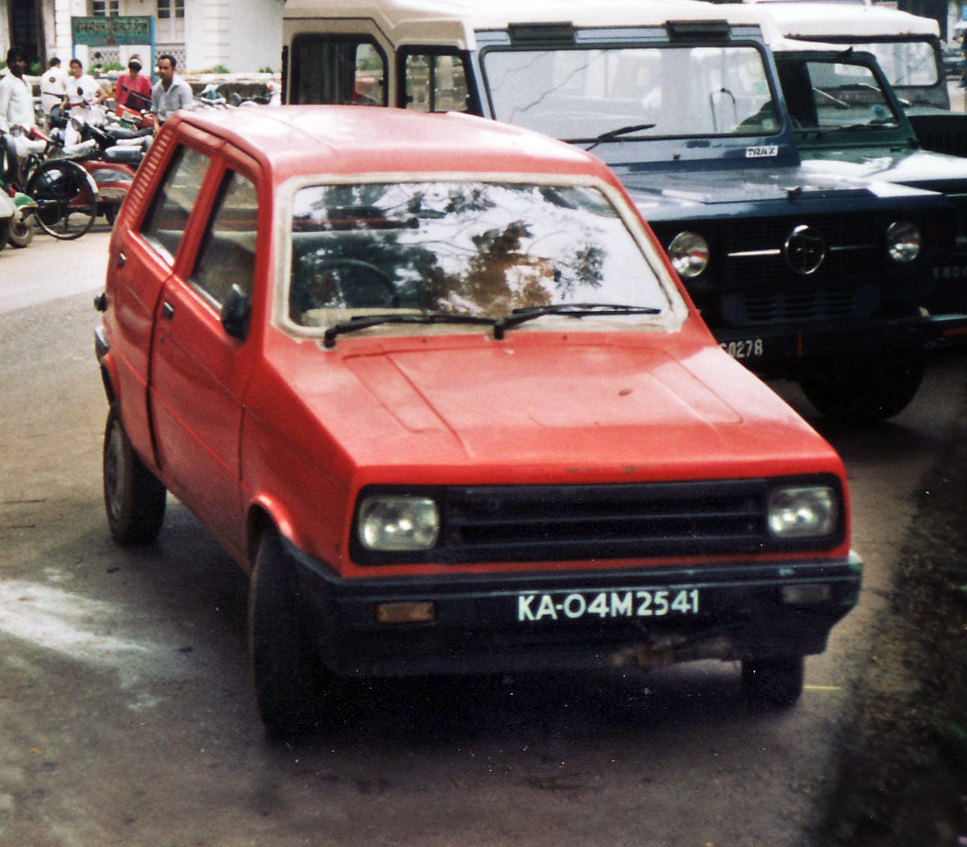
Sipani Montana

Production of the Dolphin was eclipsed by the advent of the Maruti 800. The Dolphin was updated in 1987 with a new, more square design with a longer rear overhang, and renamed the Montana. This model was 3,440 mm (135.4 in) rather than 3,327 mm (131.0 in) of the Dolphin. To compete with the five-door Maruti 800, a five-door version of the Montana was also developed, a model which outsold the two-door handsomely. The Montana also has a proper rear gate rather than the swingback window of the Dolphin, although some cars were built without the rear gate. The five-door's body was longer yet, at 3,480 mm (137.0 in), although the wheelbase still remained the same as on the original Reliant Kitten. The Montana used a number of parts from other manufacturers, including headlamps, turn signals, door handles, and windshield wipers from its competitor the Maruti 800.

In 1989 the Montana Diesel arrived, only available as a five-door. This was equipped with a 901 cc Indian-built VST Tillers three-cylinder K3C diesel engine of Mitsubishi origins; an engine originally intended for a mini-tractor. With 24 PS (18 kW) at 2700 rpm on tap, top speed was claimed to be 80–85 km/h (50–53 mph). The claimed output of the engine ranges between 20 and 25 hp depending on the source. The Montana Diesel was also heavier, at 585 kg (1,290 lb). The Montana sold better than the Dolphin, but its impact in the market was negligible at best, mainly selling in Bangalore and the surrounding area.

== D-1 ==
In 1990 Sipani presented a car called the Sipani D-1 (sometimes referred to as the Montana D1), meant to enter production in early 1991. The D-1 had a body design borrowed from the second generation Daihatsu Charade sitting on a stretched and widened version of the original Kitten underpinnings. In the interest of simplifying parts supply and keeping development costs down, the D-1 used a variety of parts from Maruti as well as Mahindra. Except for the windshield, the glazing was borrowed from other cars (leading to rather thick door pillars) but most conspicuously the D-1 received the Maruti 800's taillights as well as its brakes. The D-1 is usually shown as a five-door hatchback in marketing material, but many cars appear to have been built without a rear gate.

The petrol engine remained the same Reliant unit, but most D1s sold had a 1.5-liter Auto Tractors Ltd. diesel tractor engine of BMC origins (similar to the one used in the Ambassador Diesel), producing 40 hp (30 kW) at 4000 rpm. Auto Tractors Limited of Pratapgarh had been bought up by Sipani in 1991, and since then focused on producing diesel engines rather than tractors. One source lists the engine as having a bore and stroke of 79.4 mm × 78 mm (3.13 in × 3.07 in), indicating a displacement of 1545 cc, but these may have been preliminary figures. A four-speed manual transmission was standard, although on paper a five-speed was optional. These cars were very small players; in the fiscal year 1989–90 a mere 290 automobiles were built by Sipani, followed by a final 190 cars finished in 1991. The Montana and D-1 both continued to be listed in various automobile directories until the mid-1990s but it is uncertain when the last one was built.

== Montego ==
Sipani owner R. K. Sipani obtained a contract to assemble the Rover Montego from CKD-kits in India, following the market liberalization. It was not a success, however, with 236 cars left the factory in 1995 and only 51 more finding buyers in the next fifteen months.
