= Reliant TW9 =

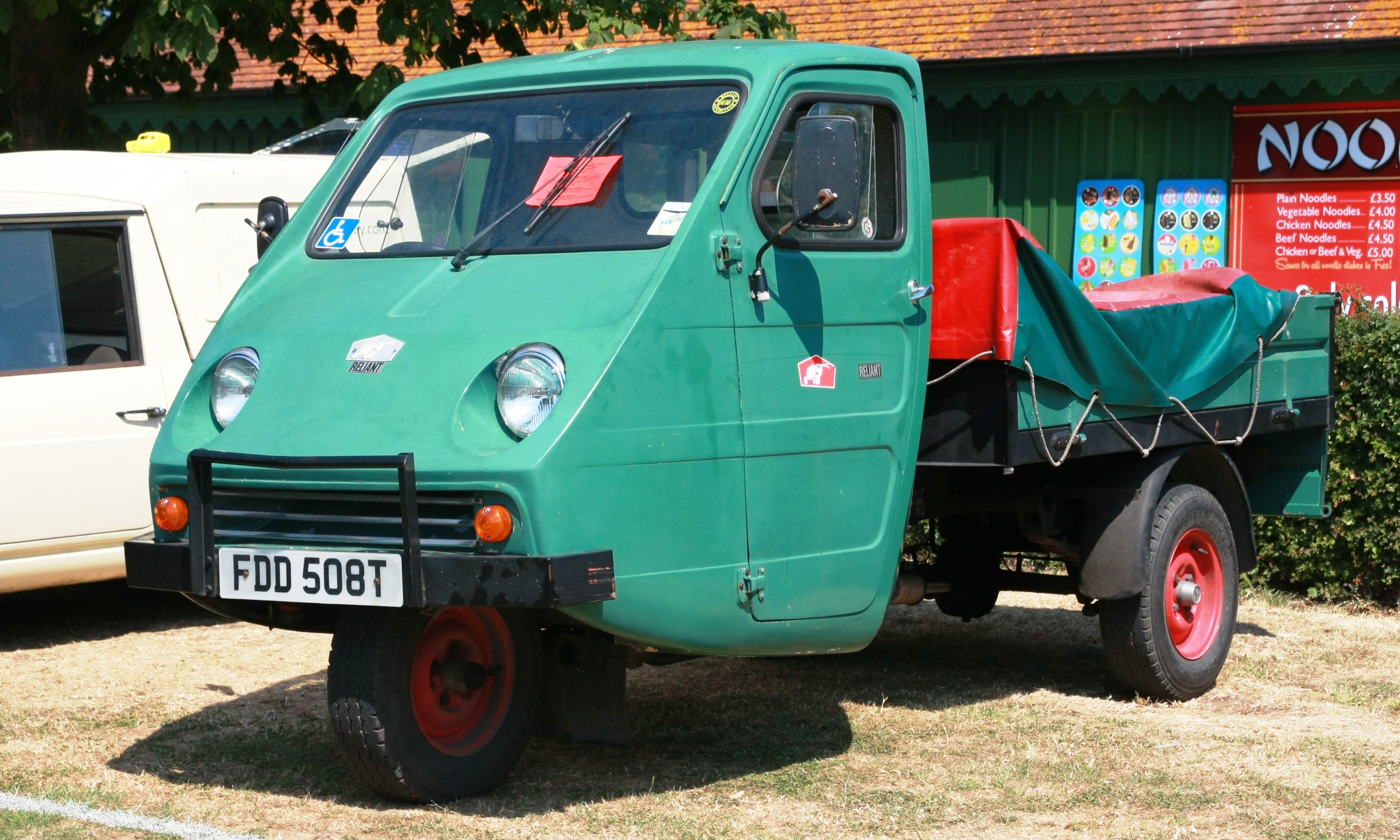

Overview
- Manufacturer: Reliant
- Also called: Reliant Ant
- Production: 1967–1987
- Assembly: United Kingdom: Tamworth, England; United Kingdom: Leeds (BTB); Greece: Athens (MEBEA)
- Designer: Tom Karen of Ogle Design

Body and chassis
- Class: Light commercial vehicle
- Body style: 2-door truck

Powertrain
- Engine: 700 cc OHV light alloy I4; 750 cc OHV light alloy I4; 850 cc OHV light alloy I4
- Transmission: 4-speed manual

The Reliant TW9 (i.e., Three-Wheeler 9), also known as the Reliant Ant, is a small, front-engined, rear-drive, three-wheeled truck that was produced from 1967 to 1987 by Reliant Motors in Tamworth and then by BTB Engineering in Leeds, England. Designed and built as a business utility vehicle, it was produced in a number of different versions for various needs.

After a long production run as the Reliant TW9, the vehicle was renamed the "Ant" by BTB engineering who continued to build it under licence until 1986. Orders were usually plentiful for the little truck as the Ant was much favoured by municipal councils in the UK and Ireland.

== Features ==
"Ant" was the most popular nickname for the TW9 and the truck was eventually marketed under that name. It used a pressed steel chassis designed by Press Mouldings and was styled by Ogle Design with a 701cc inline four-cylinder, four-stroke engine at the front, directly behind the single front wheel. It developed 27.5 bhp (20 kW) of power. The four-speed transmission had synchromesh only on the top three gears and the vehicle's unladen weight was 1200 lbs (545 kg). The glass-fibre cabin had space for two and the aerodynamic front had two round headlights and a single windscreen wiper. "Despite its apparent simplicity the cabin design incorporated gentle curves and creases to enhance structural strength. The rear wheels drove the vehicle to a maximum speed of 54 mph (86 km/h)" and delivered fuel consumption of "around 28 mpg".

The Ant was not known for being a particularly comfortable vehicle. Commercial Motor magazine noted in a 1967 road test that the seats took "the form of fixed cushions with the backrests attached to the back of the cab, offering no adjustment whatever". The magazine said that bucket seats, "with a certain amount of adjustment for drivers of varying heights, could be fitted" and that "modifications could be made" to the cab to make the interior more spacious. On the other hand, Commercial Motor complimented the low levels of noise inside the cab, the "sensibly placed" switches and gear-change lever, and found the Ant to be "very manoeuvrable" and simple to park.

== LHD version ==
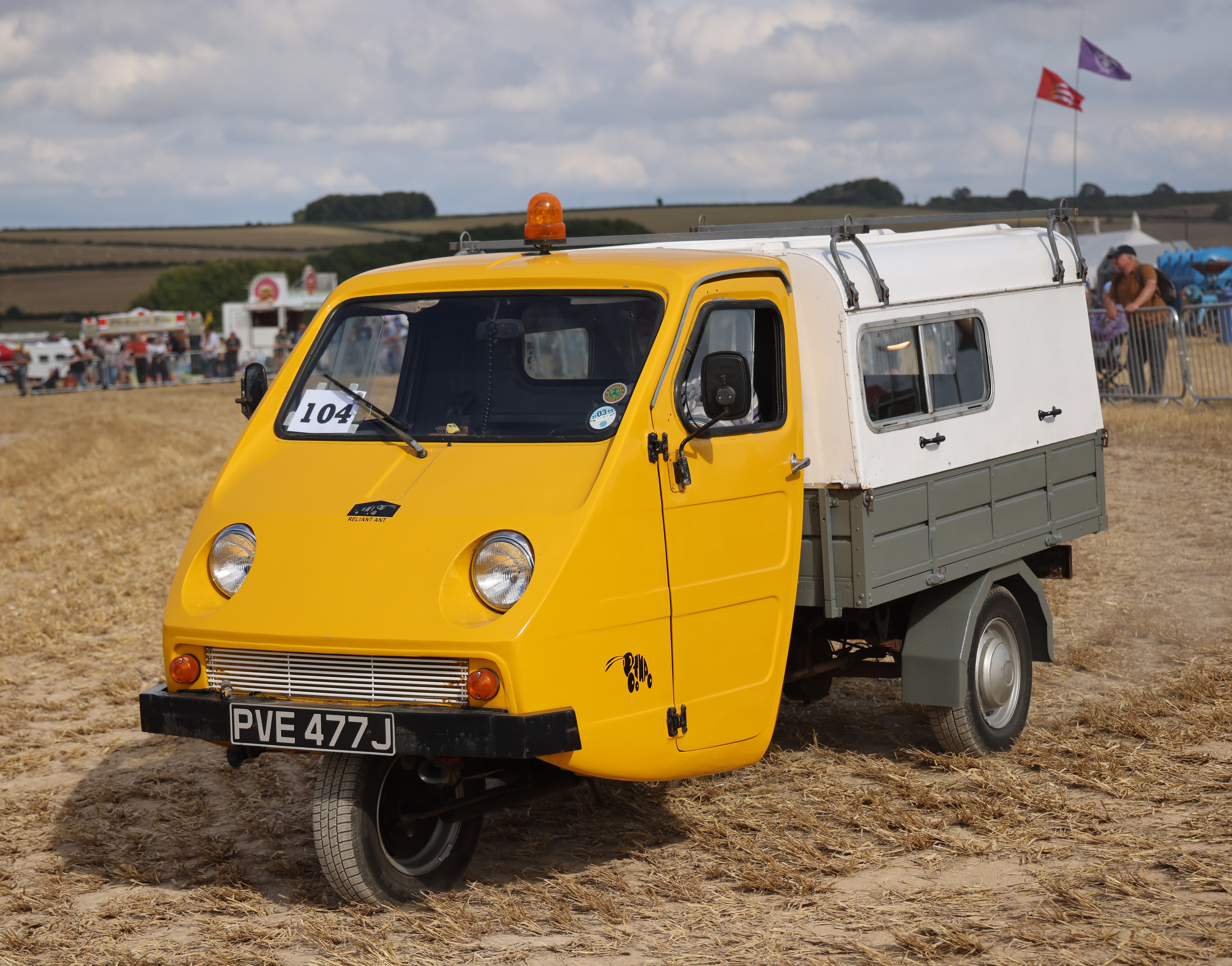
LHD Reliant TW9

The first 200 trucks were left-hand drive and built for "the Greek market". By 1971, Reliant's partner in Greece, MEBEA, was building the vehicle under license. The overseas Ant offered a load capacity of 500 kg (1100 lbs) and was intended to compete in Mediterranean countries with vehicles such as Piaggio Ape.

== RHD version ==
For the right-hand drive domestic market, a payload of 800 kg (1760 lbs) was envisaged, but with only 700cc's on tap, the Ant struggled to handle such a large load even with a very low rear axle ratio of 6.5:1. Nonetheless, Commercial Motor's test of an Ant pickup, fully laded with 800 kg of sandbags, found that on a 15-mile motorway round trip the truck averaged 48.5 mph but was capable of 68 mph downhill and 57 mph on flat stretches of road. The magazine asserted that the speeds "did not prove a hindrance to other road-users" but pointed out that "the engine laboured quite a bit" on "even slight inclines". However, Commercial Motor did not see this as a significant problem as "it must be remembered that the model was not intended for long-distance work, but for local deliveries".

"The price for a chassis and cabin was quoted as £451" upon its introduction in 1967. A 748cc engine replaced the 701cc unit in 1972 and the price of a cab-and-chassis rose to £582 the same year.

== Engines ==
Early versions of the Ant used Reliant's 701cc engine, which had "a claimed 27.5 bhp (20 kW) of power" but the 1972 engine capacity increase to 748cc brought power up to 32 bhp (23.5 kW). Performance benefitted and it is possible that newer 848cc Reliant engines may have been retro-fitted in some vehicles. Another source indicates that after 1975 Reliant itself fitted its 848cc, 45 bhp engine, giving the truck the ability to attain 50 mph and get a claimed 60 mpg.

== Customer base ==
The Ant had a long production run because, at the time, no other vehicle offered as much variety in terms of vehicle configuration for so many jobs. "Target customers in the UK were mostly local government agencies". The Ant was often sold as just a cab-and-chassis, allowing customers to fit whatever body they wanted, such as flat-beds, closed delivery vans, small water tankers, refuse collectors, street drain cleaners, snow ploughs, road sweepers and articulated tractor units. Although originally intended to be sold only outside the UK, councils in England, Wales and Scotland bought large numbers of Ants as roadsweeps in the 1970s and 1980s, along with other versions of the truck. The Dublin Corp. in Ireland purchased 60 Ants for various municipal duties.

Some 1888 Ants were built in the UK: 1229 between 1967 and 1971, and another 659 from 1972 (when the larger engine was fitted) to 1987, the year domestic production ceased. An unstated number of additional Ants were built in Greece after the vehicle went out of production in the UK.

== See also ==
- Scammell Townsman

== Sources ==
- Pither, Don: Reliant Regal & Robin, Sutton Publishing Ltd., Stroud (2001), ISBN 0-7509-2521-3
- Reliant Motor Club
