= Contessa =

Contessa may refer to:

== Entertainment ==
- Contessa (film), a 2018 Indian film
- Contessa (TV series), a 2018 Philippine television series
- The Contessa, a character in the game show Where in the World Is Carmen Sandiego?
- The Contessa, a villain from the Sly Cooper video game franchise; see Sly 2: Band of Thieves
- Contessa, a fictional ship the TV series Chuck; see "Chuck Versus the Push Mix"

=== People ===
- Emilia Contessa (1957–2025), Indonesian pop singer and actress

== Transportation ==
- Contessa 26, a GRP yacht in a range of yachts built by Jeremy Rogers Ltd. and J. J. Taylor & Sons Ltd.
- Contessa 32, a design in a range of GRP yachts built by Jeremy Rogers Ltd.
- Hino Contessa, a 1960s car made by Hino Motors
- Hindustan Contessa, an Indian car made by Hindustan Motors

== See also ==
- Barefoot Contessa (disambiguation)
- Conte (disambiguation)
- Contes (disambiguation)
