= Autocars Co. =

Israeli automotive manufacturers

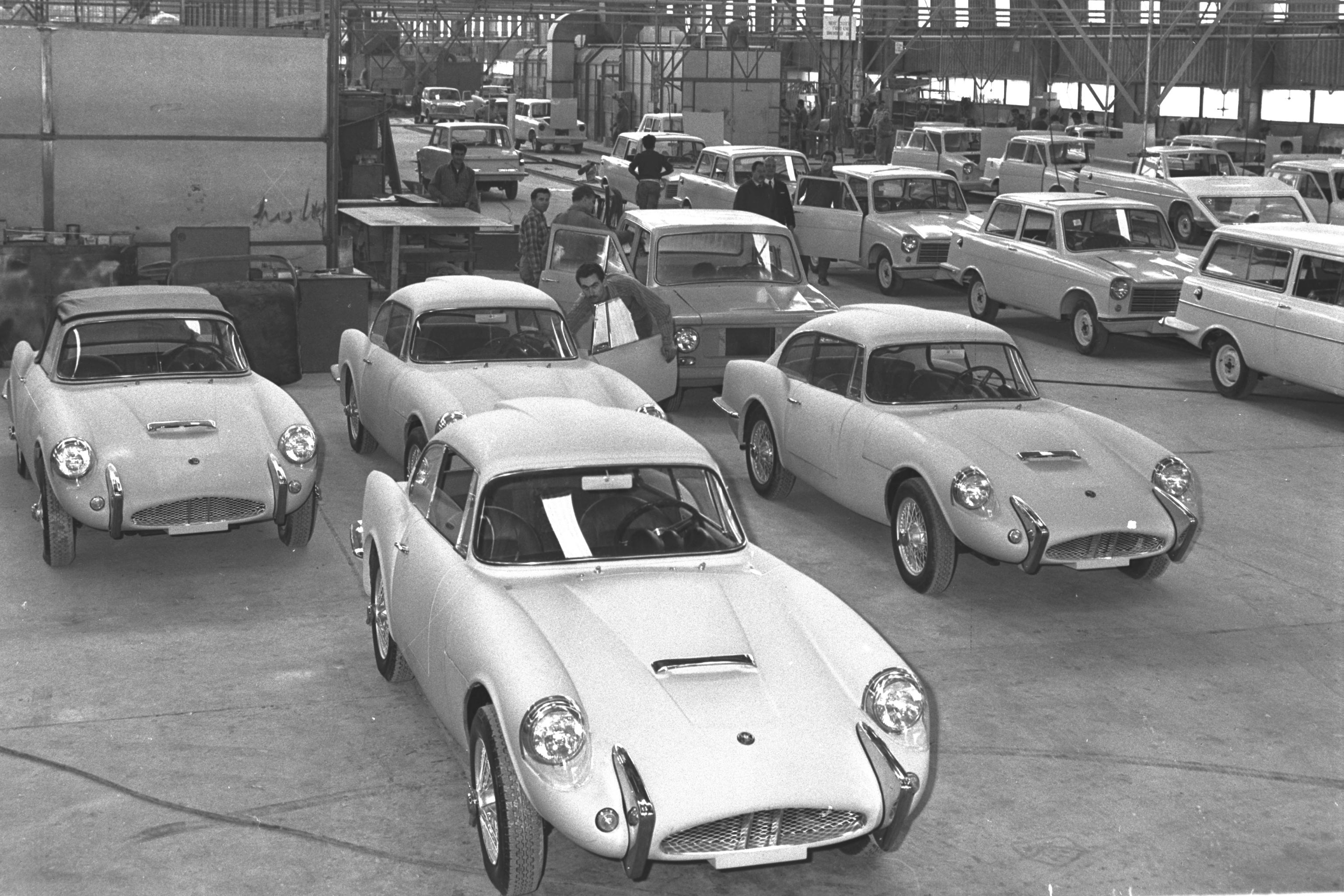
Sabra Sport, Sussita 12 station wagon, and sedans (Carmel) at the factory in 1967

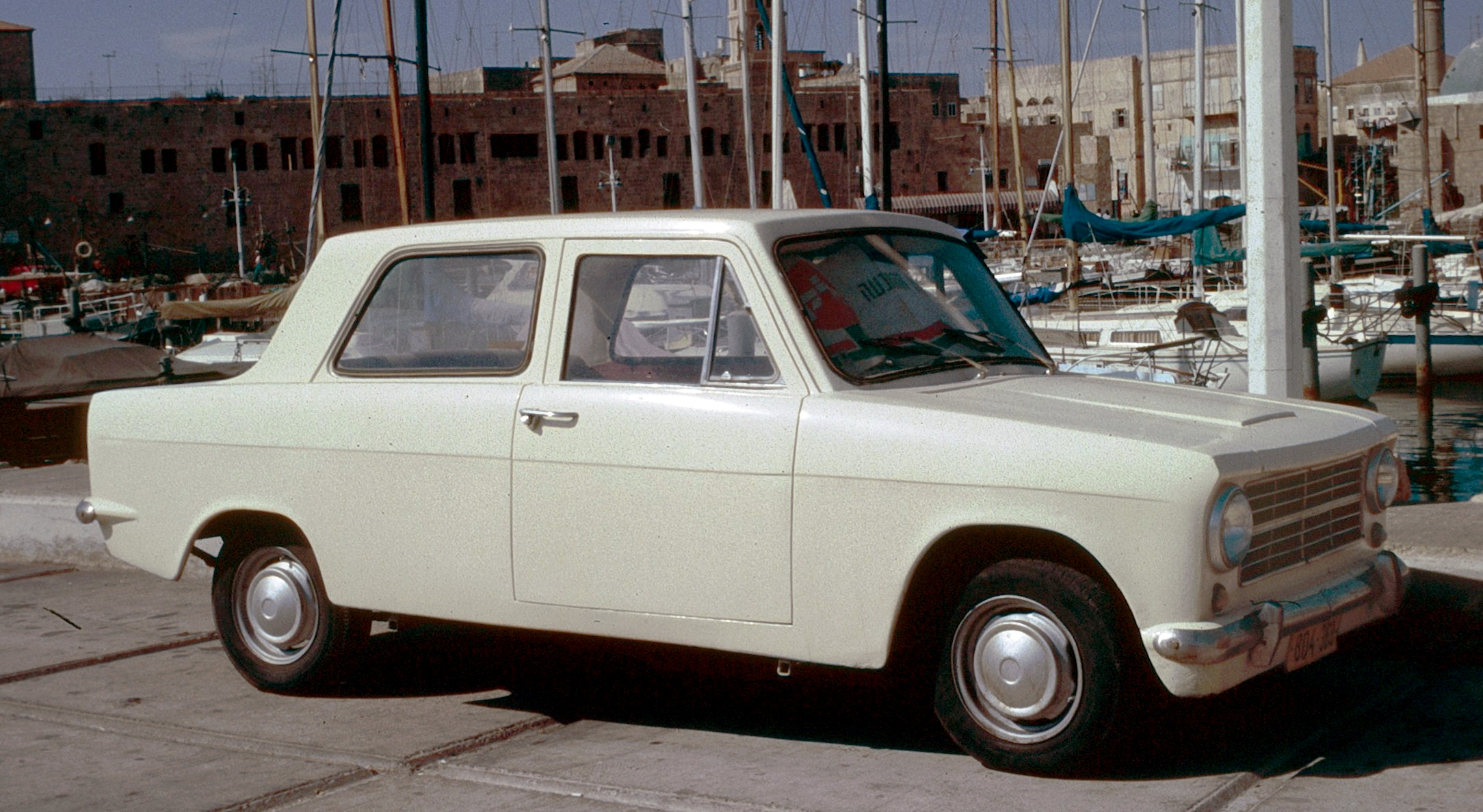
Sussita 13/60 sedan (Carmel Ducas)

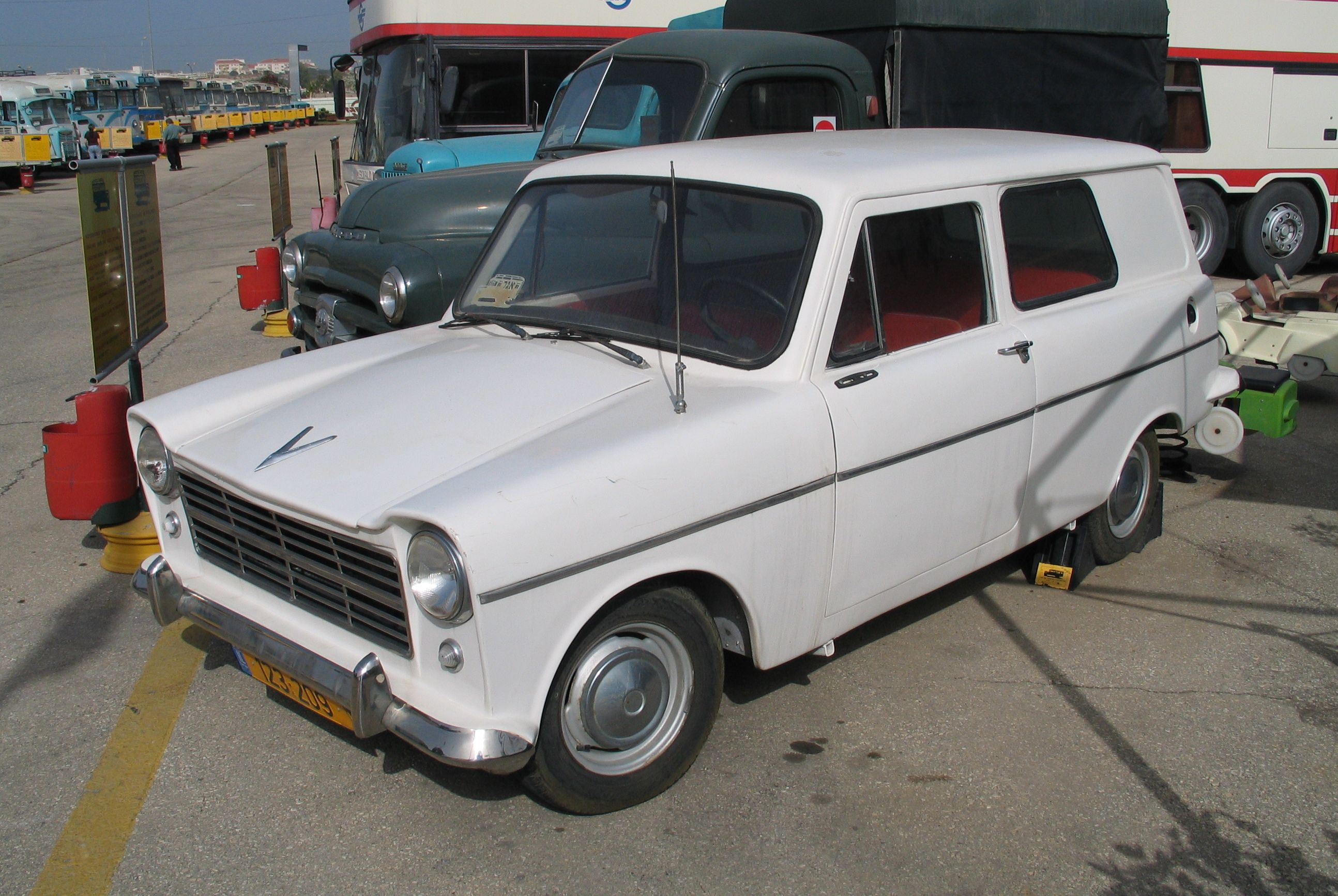
Sussita 12 station wagon

Greek Attica Sussita 12 sedan (Carmel), only about 100 of which were produced.

Autocars Co. Ltd. (Hebrew: אוטוקרס) of Haifa, Israel, was Israel's first car manufacturer.

== History ==
Autocars Ltd, founded in 1957, made fiberglass-shelled cars that were popular in Israel during the 1960s and 1970s. Government agencies were forced to buy them. This released onto the market thousands of low-priced second hand vehicles. Although their style and finish left something to be desired, Autocar's use of Ford and Triumph engines made them reliable cars which kept their value for years. The manufacturing of these cars ceased during the 1980s, and Israel's only remaining car making company today is AIL.

Autocars manufactured its own car models under the Sabra (Hebrew: צברה) brand. The line included a station wagon, pick-up and the Sabra Sport, a sports car derived from Reliant.

From 1960, the sport model was produced under the Sabra brand, and the station wagon, sedan and pick-up models were produced under the Sussita brand name (Sussita (סוסיתא), Sussita 12 and Sussita 13/60 models). Following an agreement with the Greek automotive manufacturer Attica, a small number of Sussita 12 sedans (Carmel) were produced in Greece.

Apart from its own brand, Autocars also assembled other car manufacturers’ models, such as Reliant Regal, and Triumph 1300 / 1500. These models were built using complete kits received from the brands owners.

== Models for the Israeli market ==
Sussita (A.K.A "Cube") - manufactured from 1960 till 1966. 2 doors station wagon and pick-up versions. Designed with the help of the British Reliant company. The car was built using various Ford's parts, mainly the Ford Anglia engine.

Carmel - manufactured from 1962 till 1964. A clone of the British three wheeler Reliant Regal, that was modified to have 4 wheels. The model had many problems, and was discontinued. The Carmel label was later given to next generations of the Sussita sedans.

Sussita 12 - manufactured from 1964 till 1970. Body versions:2 doors station wagon, 2 doors sedan (A.K.A Carmel), 4 doors sedan (A.K.A Gilboa) and pick-up versions. Till 1968 the Sussita 12 used the Ford Anglia engines, where the Gilboa had an optional 1500cc Ford's engine. From 1968 to 1970 the station wagon and sedans (Carmel and Gilboa), used the Triumph Herald 12/50 engine.

Sussita 13/60 - manufactured from 1970 till 1975. 2 doors station wagon, 2 doors sedan (A.K.A Carmel Ducas), and pick-up versions. 4 door sedan was not produced. The Sussita 13/60 was built on the British Triumph Herald's chassis, and used the Herald 13/60 engine and gearbox.

Autocars assembled several car models of other manufactures, using complete kits received from them. For example:

Triumph 1300 / Triumph 1500 - British Triumph cars from kits in the late 1960s. The Triumph lineup included the Triumph 1300, although originally only with a 1500 engine as the 1300 was considered too close to the 1.3 litre Hino Contessa.

Hino Contesa 900 / Hino Contesa 1300 - Assembled from original kits received from Hino Japan. The franchise, to assemble the Contessa, moved in 1969 from Eilin to Autocars, after the Israeli government forced the merger of the two companies. The contract was discontinued when Toyota had taken over Hino.

Autocars went bankrupt in 1970. Its assembly lines were bought by Rom Carmel Industries. Rom Carmel continued to manufacture the Sussita 13/60, till 1975. Rom Carmel manufactured their own models: Rom Carmel 1300, and Rom Carmel 1301, till 1980.

== Sabra ==
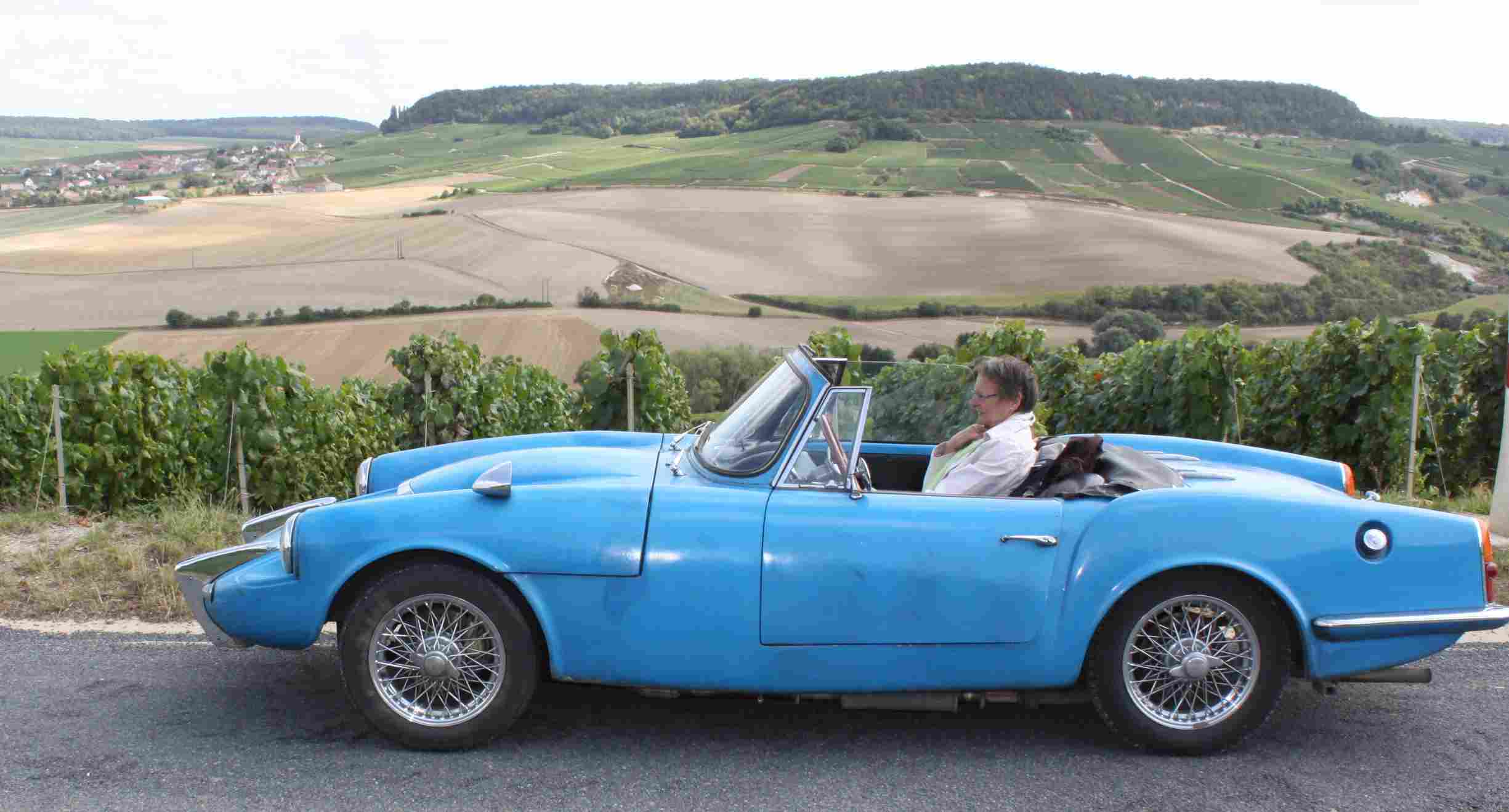
Autocars Sabra Sport

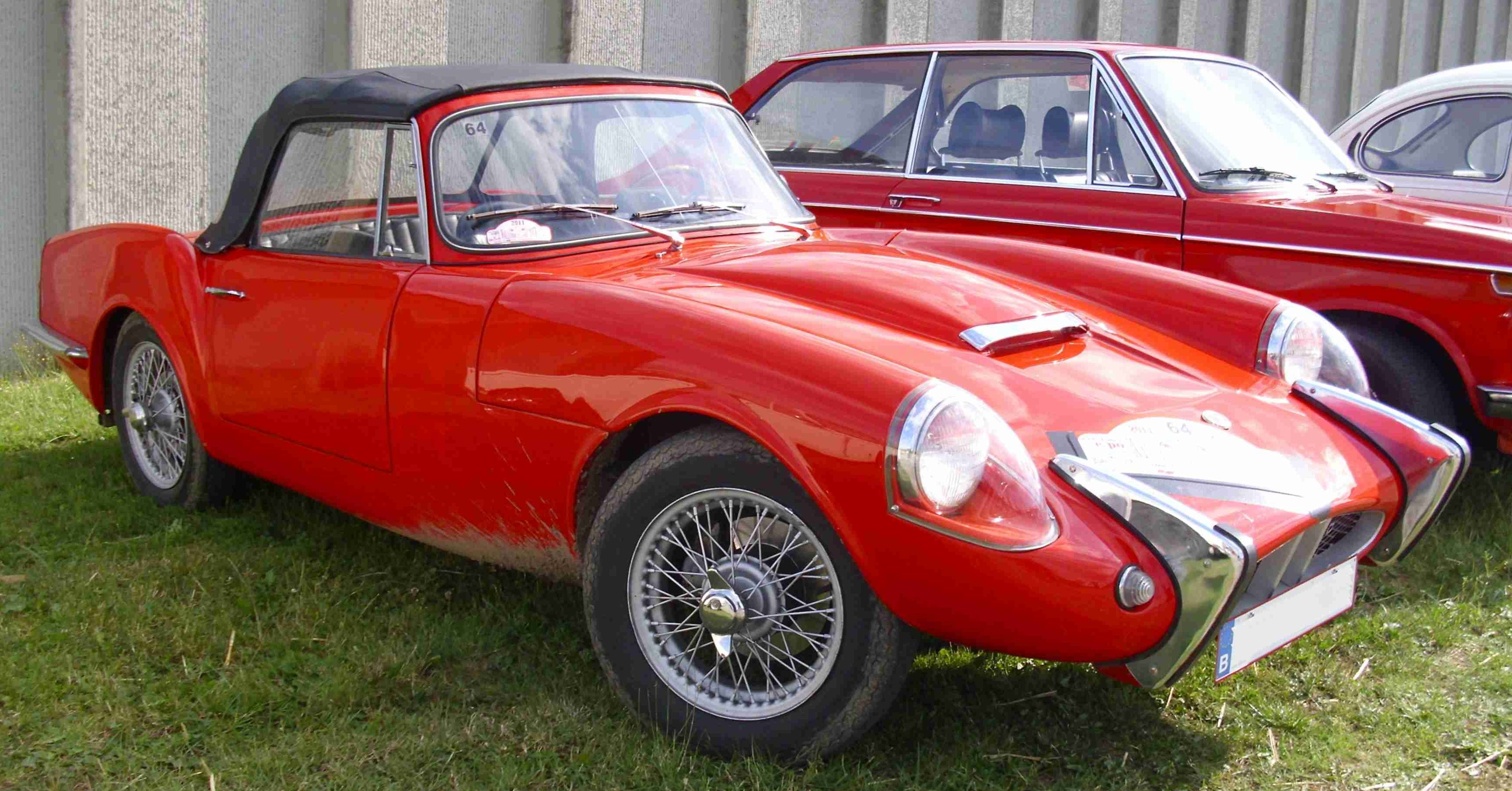
Autocars Sabra Sport

The name "Sabra" was chosen because it means both "born in Israel" and a cactus (its fruit, prickly pear), which was used as its logo. In 1960, Yitzhak Shubinsky launched an Israeli-made car at the autoshow in New York City. It was a very small, underpowered pick-up truck. At the show Shubinsky realized that it was a futile attempt, and set forth on a new project.

He bought the rights to use an Ashley body on a Leslie Ballamy chassis. He reached an agreement with Reliant (who had helped producing the "Carmel" and the "Sussita") to combine engine, body and chassis into a convertible sports-car. The engine was a Ford 1703 cc. Reliant was authorized to deliver the first 100 cars to the United States market.

In 1961, at the New York Autoshow, the first Sabras were introduced. Reliant produced the first 100 cars. Their VIN-plates read "AUTOCARS COMPANY LIMITED HAIFA ISRAEL", though they were actually made in the United Kingdom. The rest of the cars were produced in Israel, but only 41 of those were exported to the USA. One of these was entered into the 12 Hours of Sebring in 1963 but did not finish due to a drive shaft failure.

Between 1964 and 1968, some 81 cars – a quarter of the Israeli production – were exported to Belgium. Production stopped with the Six-Day War. Orders already placed were honoured, but delivery was delayed until 1968–69. Worldwide, over 100 Sabra cars are still traceable, over twenty of them in Belgium.

The Sabra can also be seen on a record cover of the Israeli band צמד דרום.

== See also ==
- Economy of Israel
