= Triumph Toledo =

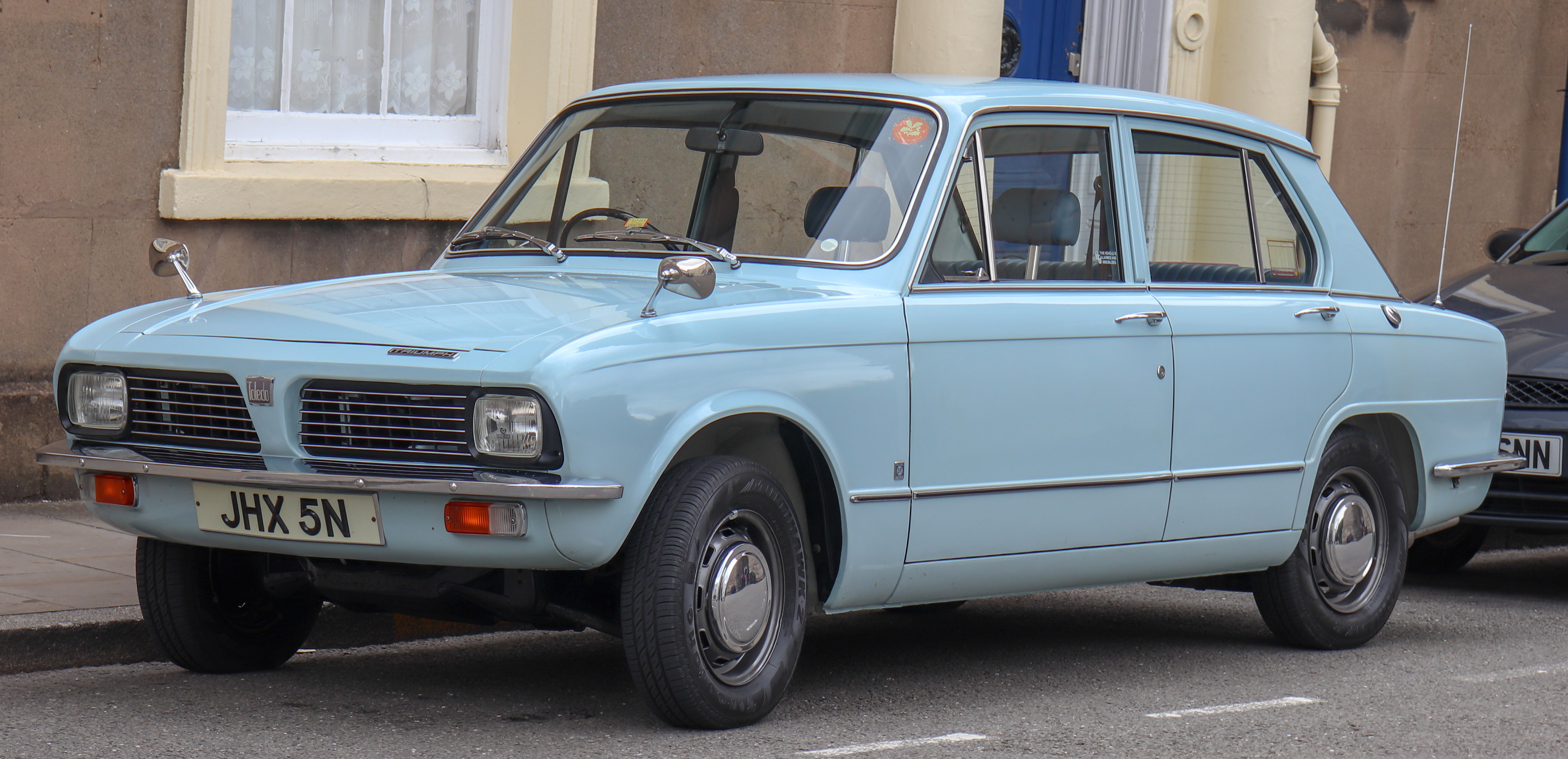
- Triumph Toledo 4-door saloon

Overview
- Manufacturer: Triumph (British Leyland)
- Production: August 1970 – March 1976; 1300 cc: 113,294 made; 1500 cc: 5,888 made
- Assembly: United Kingdom: Canley, Coventry; United Kingdom: Speke, Merseyside; New Zealand: Nelson (NZMC)

Body and chassis
- Body style: 2-door saloon; 4-door saloon
- Layout: FR layout

Powertrain
- Engine: 1296/1493 cc I4
- Transmission: 4-speed manual

Dimensions
- Wheelbase: 97 in (2,464 mm)
- Length: 156 in (3,962 mm)
- Width: 62 in (1,575 mm)
- Height: 54 in (1,372 mm)
- Curb weight: 1,960 lb (890 kg)

Chronology
- Predecessor: Triumph 1300
- Successor: Triumph Dolomite

The Triumph Toledo is a compact car which was produced by the Rover-Triumph division of British Leyland in the United Kingdom from 1970 to 1976.

The Toledo was introduced in August 1970 as a cheaper version of the Triumph 1300, which was at the same time replaced by the Triumph 1500. The Toledo, like the front-wheel drive 1500, came with a new split grille at the front, but instead of the 1500's twin round headlamps, it had single rectangular units set in a grey plastic grille. The rear end was like that of the 1300 except for the tail lights, which were of a simpler, flat-faced design.

The biggest change for the Toledo was a move to rear-wheel drive and live rear axle (still with coil springs), in the interest of simplicity and low production costs. The interior was also cheaper, with wood confined to a dashboard consisting of a simple plank with holes drilled for the quite basic instrumentation but the interior was a cut above most other small cars at a time when black plastic was commonplace.

Initially, the Toledo was only available as a two-door saloon with the 1296 cc engine Standard SC engine of 58 bhp (43.3 kW) net. Drum brakes were fitted all round and there was no overdrive or automatic option available.

In March 1971 a 4-door "special export" version was launched at the Geneva Motor Show, featuring a 1500 cc engine in single and twin carburettor "TC" form producing 61 and 64 bhp (45 and 48 kW) net, respectively. From late August 1971 the four-door model was also available on the home market. The four-door Toledo featured the same side body pressings as the Triumph 1300. The interior furnishings were in most respects indistinguishable between the two versions, but buyers of the four-door car received two extra ashtrays in each of the extra doors. Radial ply tyres were specified in place of the cross-plies offered on the two-door car, compensating for the additional 50 kg (approx) of weight involved in installing the extra doors.

The two-door model differed very little from the more popular four-door model in overall appearance, the two-door featured non-wraparound front and rear bumpers (although this would change in 1973 to full wraparound bumpers), whilst the four-door featured wraparound bumpers from the start. Two front bumper under-riders were fitted to the two-door model; however these were deleted on later cars from around late 1972 / early 1973.

The specification gradually improved over the years. In October 1972 front disc brakes were fitted as standard on both models and a heated rear window became standard equipment by late 1973 / early 1974.

In March 1975 the two-door version was dropped: the four-door model continued in production for another year, but in improved specification form. The existing Triumph Herald three-rail type gearbox was replaced with a Triumph Spitfire 1500 type single-rail gearbox and the car was fitted with a new clutch. The new look Toledo was also fitted with side body trims, new look black type front grille (replacing the silver type front grille) and a stainless trim was added to the side roof guttering. The specification again improved; standard equipment now included a rear-view dipping mirror, fasten seat belt warning light, reclining front seats (previously an option), twin reversing lights (also previously an option), cigar lighter, hazard warning lights and a driver's exterior door mirror. A laminated windscreen, front head rests and brushed nylon seat facings were optional extras. The Toledo was finally replaced by the Dolomite 1300 and 1500 in March 1976. Total production was 119,182 cars, making it one of Triumph's best-selling small saloon cars.

Complete knock down kits from Triumph were still being assembled by the New Zealand Motor Corporation in 1977 for the New Zealand market and registered as late as 1978. These final Toledos had some of the refinements of post-1976 Dolomites, including a silver-coloured grille and rubber strips along the side of the car. However, they retained the shorter Toledo shell.

Technical updates were as few as the cosmetic ones. In October 1971 the compression was raised from 8.5:1 to 9:1 for the 1500, raising power from 61 to 64 brake horsepower (45 to 48 kW) net. In October 1972 the previously optional front disc brakes became standard, and in March 1975 the TC also received the higher compression and now boasted 71 brake horsepower (53 kW).

Performance was middle-of the-road, top speed being around 85 to 90 miles per hour (137 to 145 km/h) (despite the speedometer on the 1500s being far more optimistic), acceleration 0 to 60 miles per hour (97 km/h) was 17.1 s (1300) to 13.6 s (TC).

Triumph developed a Toledo "TS" two-door in 1973. It featured a 1500 cc twin-carburettor engine, but never entered production.

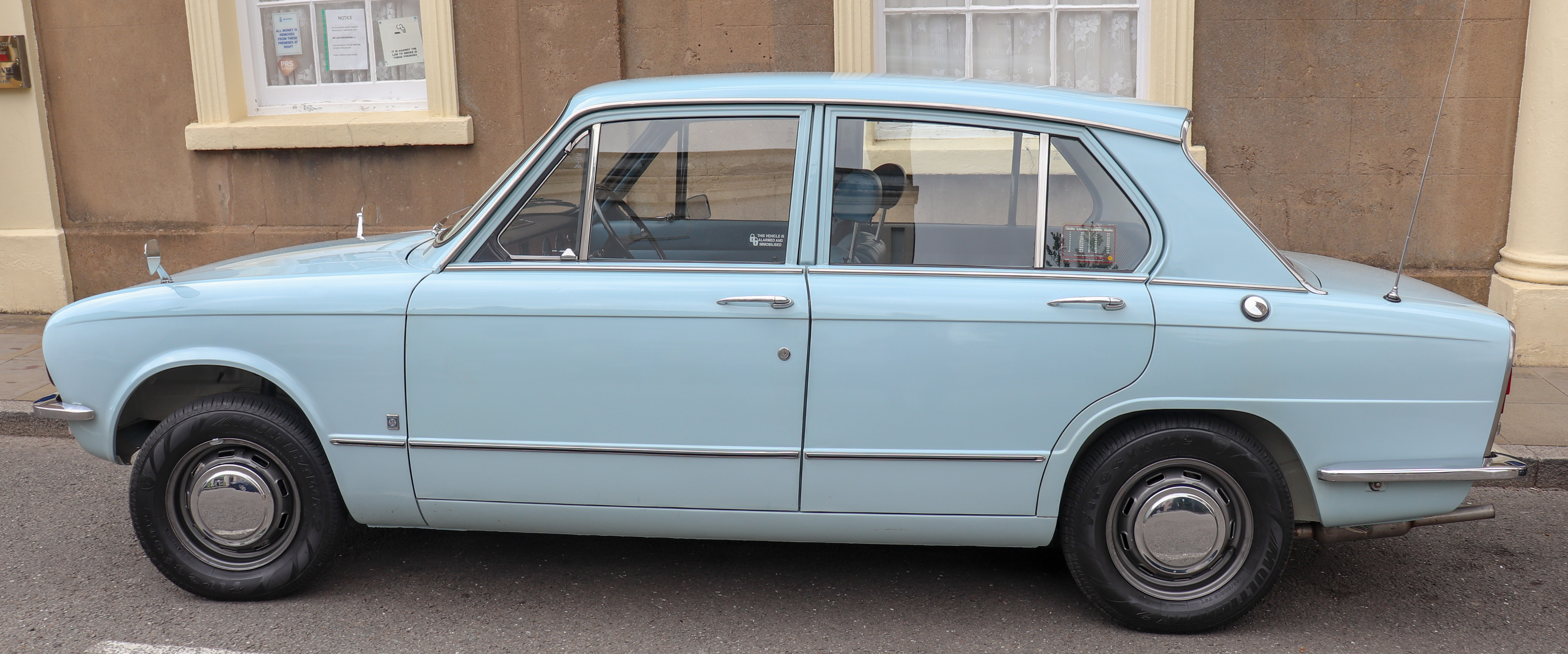
Triumph 1300 4-door saloon

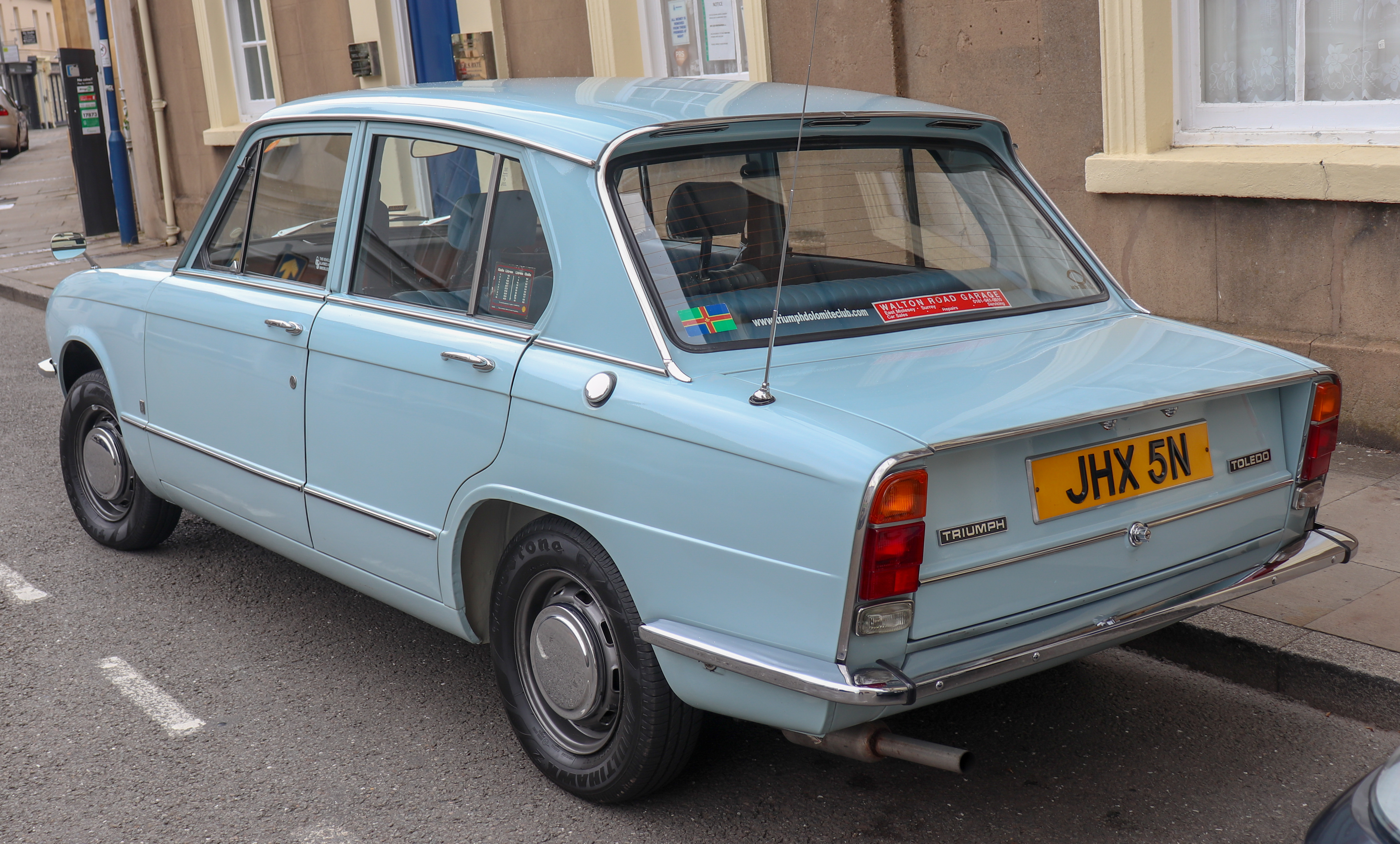
Triumph 1300 4-door saloon (rear view)

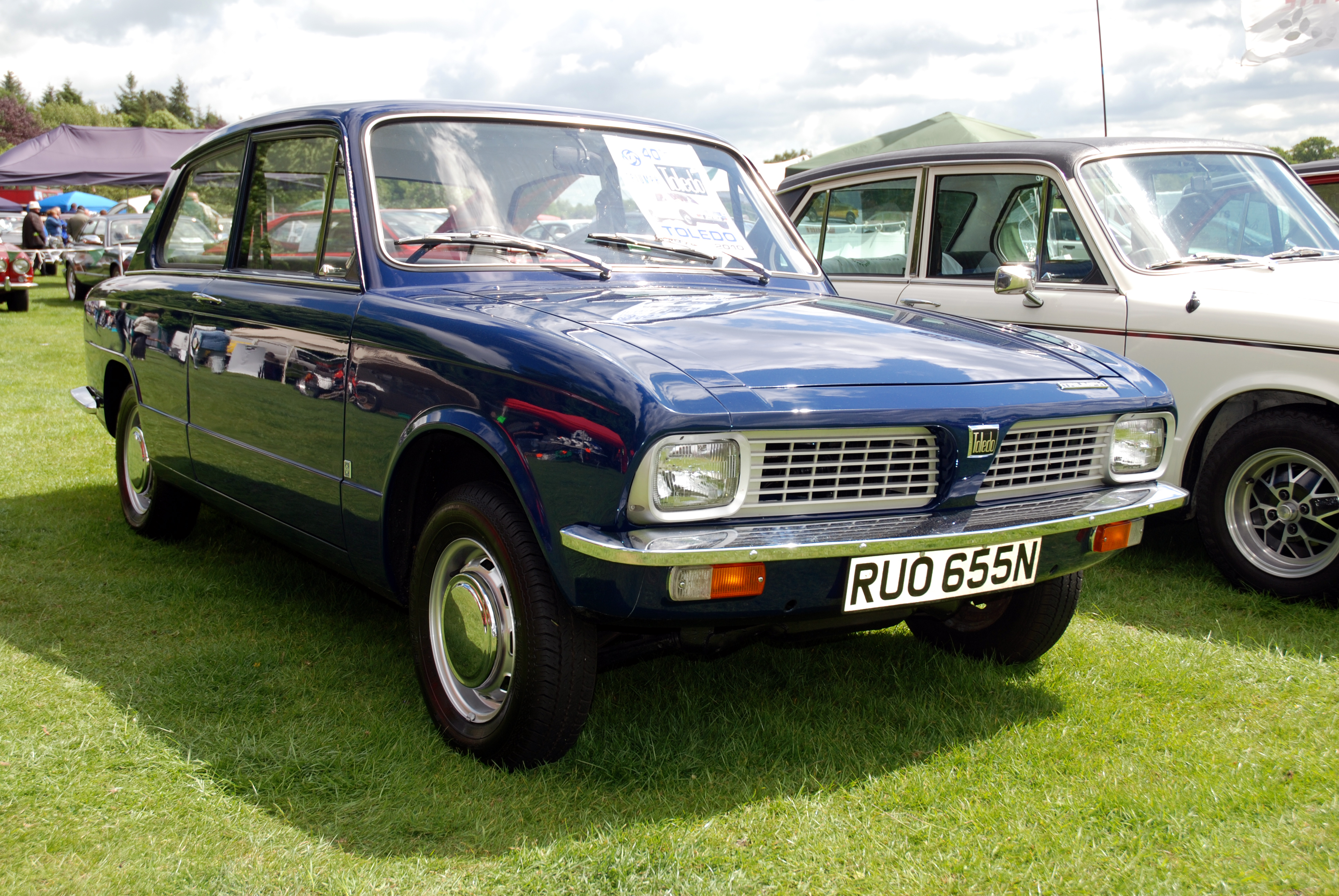
Triumph Toledo 2-door saloon

== Recall ==
In August 1973, along with its 1500 and Dolomite siblings, the Triumph Toledo was the subject of the UK's largest vehicle recall to date. The recall affected 103,000 cars and involved the replacement of a front radius strut in the front suspension assembly, addressing a risk that the component might break and render the car impossible to steer. The manufacturers stated they had replicated the alleged defect by driving the car into a solid kerb at between 10 and 15 mph (16–24 km/h). Despite undertaking the recall, they insisted that the condition could only "arise through misuse".
