= Barefoot Contessa (disambiguation) =

Barefoot Contessa is an American cooking show hosted by celebrity chef Ina Garten.

Barefoot Contessa may also refer to:

- The Barefoot Contessa, a 1954 drama film
- Barefoot Contessa (band), a British indie band of the late 1990s
- Judy Grable (1935–2008), American professional wrestler who used the ringname "The Barefoot Contessa"

== See also ==
- Contessa (disambiguation)
