= Comte =

Comte is the French, Catalan and Occitan form of the word "count" (Latin: comes); comté is the Gallo-Romance form of the word "county" (Latin: comitatus).

Comte or Comté may refer to:

- Comte, French for a count (i.e. the nobleman)
- Comté, a county in France (territory ruled by a count)
- La Comté, a commune in the Pas-de-Calais department of northern France
- Comté cheese, a cheese from Franche-Comté, eastern France

== People with the surname ==
- Alfred Comte (1895–1965), Swiss aviation pioneer
- Auguste Comte (1798–1857), French philosopher
- Charles Comte (1782–1837), French lawyer, journalist and political writer
- Claudine le Comte (born 1950), Belgian fencer
- Fabienne Comte, French statistician
- Fernando Compte (1930–2013), founder and first president of the International Sambo Federation
- Ferran Soriano i Compte (born 1967), Spanish CEO of various football clubs, including Manchester City F.C.
- Harry Comte (1909—1945), Australian rules footballer
- Louis Comte (1788–1859), French magician
- Maurice Compte (born 1969), American actor
- Pere Compte (died 1506), Spanish Catalan architect
- Raphaël Comte (born 1979), Swiss politician

== See also ==
- Vicomte, the French equivalent of a viscount
- Franche-Comté, a traditional province of eastern France
- Conde (disambiguation), the Spanish, Portuguese and Galician term for Count
- Conte (disambiguation), the Italian term for Count
- Le Compte (disambiguation)
