= Conde =

Conde is the Ibero-Romance form of "count" (Latin comitatus). It may refer to:

- Counts in Iberia
- List of countships in Portugal

== Places ==
=== Brazil ===
- Conde, Bahia
- Conde, Paraíba

=== France ===
- Condé-sur-l'Escaut (or simply 'Condé'), a commune

=== São Tomé and Príncipe ===
- Conde, São Tomé and Príncipe

=== United States ===
- Conde, South Dakota, a city

== People ==
- Conde McGinley, American far-right publisher (1890–1963)

== Surname ==
- Conde (surname)

== See also ==
- Count
- Comte (disambiguation) (French, Catalan and Occitan term for "Count")
- Conte (disambiguation) (Italian term for "Count")
- Condé (disambiguation)
