= Del Conte =

Del Conte may also refer to:

People

- Jacopino del Conte (1510–1598), Italian Mannerist painter, active in both Rome and Florence.
- Anna Del Conte (born 1925), Italian-born food writer whose works cover the history of food as well as providing recipes.
- Natali Morris (née Del Conte; born 1978), American online media personality and businesswoman

Places

- Villa del Conte, an Italian municipality of the province of Padua, Veneto.
- Case del Conte, an Italian village and hamlet of Montecorice (SA), Campania.

== See also ==
- Conte
