= Conte (surname) =

Conte is an Italian or Guinean surname. Notable people with the surname include:

- Aicha Nénette Conté, Guinean diplomat and politician
- Antoine Conte (born 1994), French-Guinean footballer
- Antonio Conte (born 1969), Italian football manager and former player
- Bambasé Conté (born 2003), German footballer
- Carmelo Conte (born 1938), Italian lawyer and politician
- Chris Conte (born 1989), American football player
- Claudia Conte (born 1999), Spanish heptathlete
- Facundo Conte (born 1989), Argentine volleyball player
- Gian Biagio Conte (born 1941), Italian classicist
- Giorgio Conte (born 1941), Italian singer-songwriter and composer
- Giuseppe Conte (born 1964), Prime Minister of Italy 2018–2021
- Hugo Conte (born 1963), Argentine volleyball player
- Ignacio Conte (born 1969), Spanish footballer
- Joanne Conte (1933–2013), American politician
- Lamine Conte (born 1998), Guinean footballer
- Lansana Conté (1934–2008), former President of Guinea
- Maria Pia Conte (born 1944), Italian actress
- Matthew Conte, (born 1999), Political organizer
- Maureen Conte, American biogeochemist
- Miriana Conte, Maltese singer
- Mirko Conte (born 1974), Italian footballer
- Nicola Conte, Italian DJ and producer
- Nicolas-Jacques Conté, French painter, balloonist, army officer, and inventor of the modern pencil
- Paolo Conte (born 1937), Italian singer and composer
- Pasquale Conte, Italian-born American mobster
- Richard Conte (1910–1975), United States actor
- Richard Conte (artist) (born 1953), French contemporary artist
- Silvio O. Conte (1921–1991), United States congressman
- Steve Conte (born 1960), American songwriter and guitarist
- Tom Conte, American computer scientist
- Victor Conte, nutritionist at the center of the BALCO steroids scandal
