= Hino Contessa =

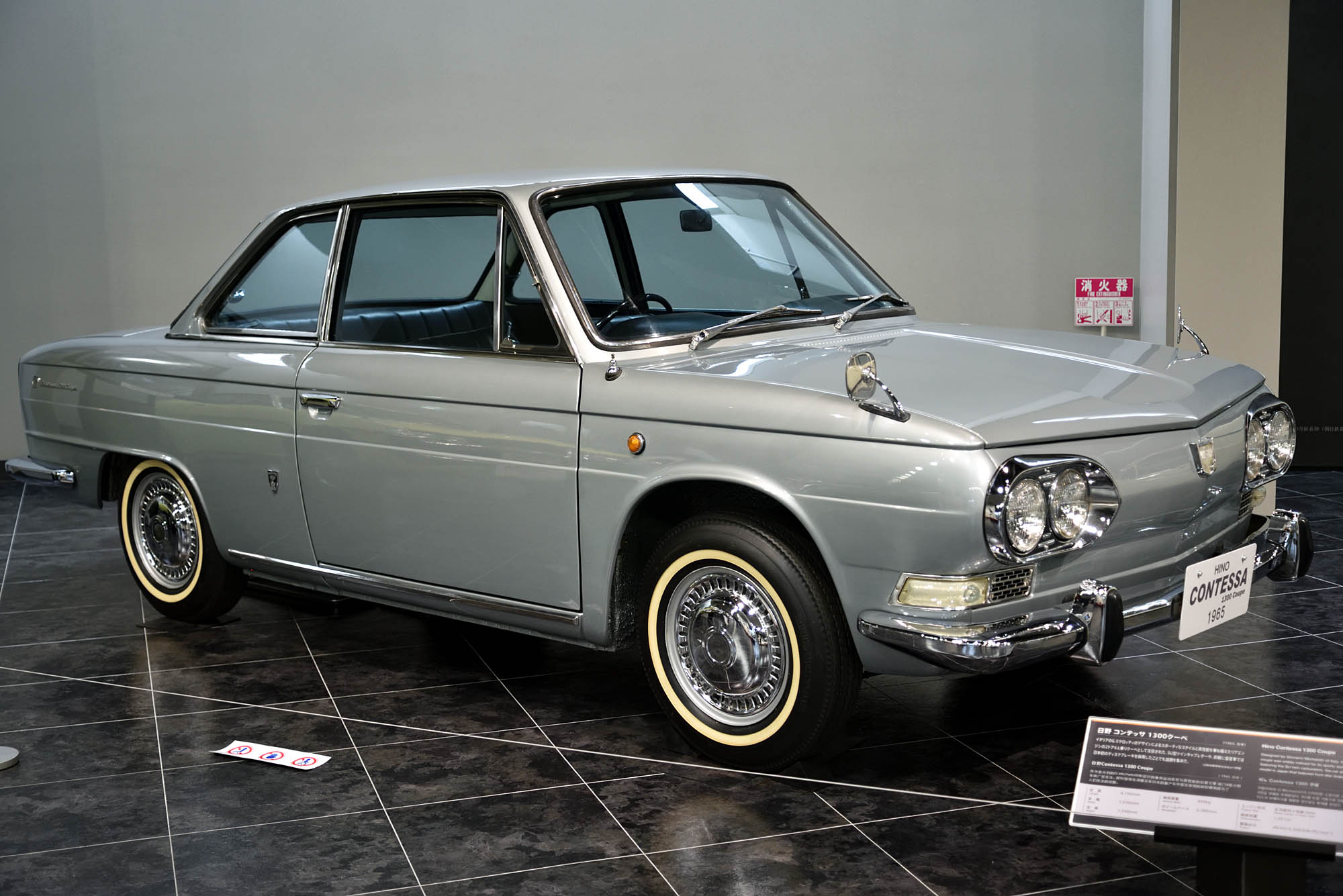
Hino Contessa 1300 Coupe

The Hino Contessa is an automobile which was produced by Hino Motors from 1961 to 1967.

The Contessa was developed largely from the 1947–1961 Renault 4CV powertrain under license to Hino Motors. Offered in both coupe and sedan bodystyles, it replaced the Hino Renault, which was the Renault 4CV manufactured by Hino for Japan. It was adapted into a small pickup truck called the Hino Briska, but used a front engine and rear drive powertrain, while the Contessa used a rear engine and rear drive setup. The PC series coupé was designed by Giovanni Michelotti, while the second generation was longer and wider in both coupé and sedan bodystyles.

Unlike many cars found internationally of this time period, using rear drive and rear engined powertrains, the Contessa was water-cooled rather than air-cooled. The name contessa is Italian for a countess.

== PC series (1961–1964) ==
Contessa (PC series)
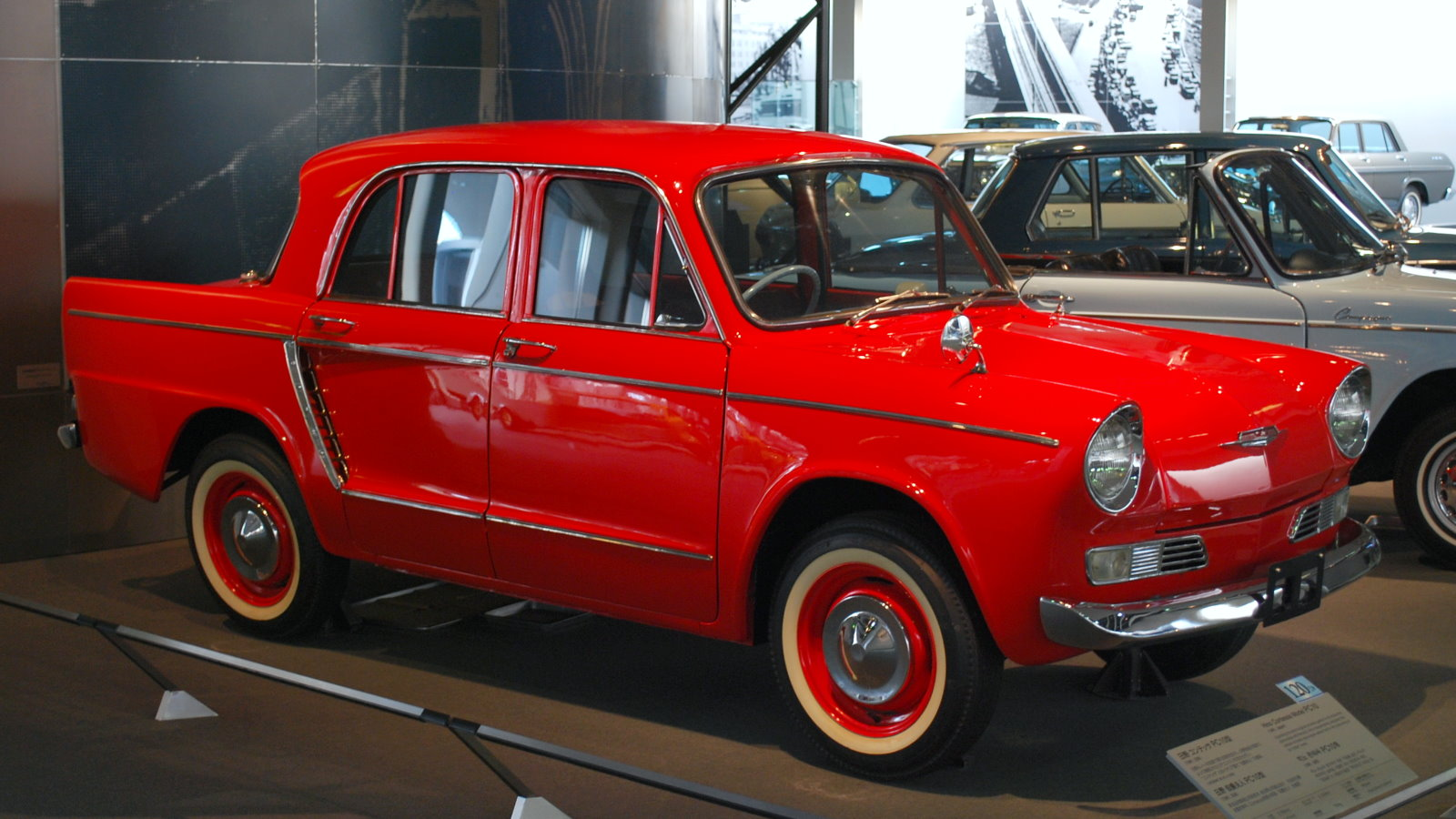

Overview
- Manufacturer: Hino Motors
- Production: 1961–1964
- Assembly: Hamura, Tokyo, Japan; Haifa, Israel (Kaiser-Illin Industries)

Body and chassis
- Class: compact
- Body style: 2-door coupé; 4-door sedan
- Layout: RR layout
- Related: Hino Briska; Renault 4CV

Powertrain
- Engine: 893 cc GP20 inline-4
- Transmission: 3/4-speed manual

Dimensions
- Wheelbase: 2,150 mm (84.6 in)
- Length: 3,795 mm (149.4 in); 3,830 mm (150.8 in) (Sprint)
- Width: 1,475 mm (58.1 in)
- Height: 1,415 mm (55.7 in); 1,200 mm (47.2 in) (Sprint)
- Curb weight: 750 kg (1,650 lb); 650 kg (1,430 lb) (Sprint)

Chronology
- Predecessor: Hino Renault (series PA)

47,299 of the PC-series Contessa were built, between April 1961 and the second quarter of 1964. With an 893 cc version of the Renault-based GP engine, max power is 35 PS (26 kW; 35 hp) which provides a top speed of 110 km/h (68 mph). The first Contessa originally received a three-speed column mounted shifter, later a four-speed manual became optional, utilizing an electromagnetic clutch apparatus called Shinko-Hinomatic. The gear change came in for a certain amount of criticism, a result of its long and cumbersome linkage from the steering column to the rear-mounted transmission.

As Hino had a business relationship with Renault at the time, and the powertrain was largely adapted from an existing Renault product, there are clear similarities to the Renault Dauphine. The drivetrain and suspension were carried over from the Hino Renault 4CV (series PA). The main improvement over the 4CV was that the Contessa 900 was a full five-seater, making it a much stronger competitor. The engine was installed longitudinally, meaning the radiator was against the outer edge of the engine bay, whereas the Renault installed the radiator against the firewall, and the Hino engine sat in a north-south orientation with the transmission attached inside the engine bay next to the Contessa's firewall. The engine was slanted to the left, and utilized a crossflow cylinder head. The rear suspension used swing axles.

The first Contessa was never intended for export, although foreign language brochures were printed up for the Michelotti-designed Contessa 900 Sprint Coupé. Aside from the stylish bodywork, the 100 kg lighter Sprint (650 kg or 1,430 lb) also benefitted from an Officine Nardi-tuned engine (and matching steering wheel) with Weber carburetors and 45 PS (33 kW; 44 hp). The Sprint was introduced at both the 10th Tokyo Auto Show, and the Turin Motor Show in 1962, and followed at the New York Auto Show in 1963. Top speed was claimed to be 140 km/h (87 mph). So that there would be no doubts about its provenance, the scuff plates at the bottom of the door apertures read "Hino-Michelotti". The Sprint had a floor-mounted shifter.

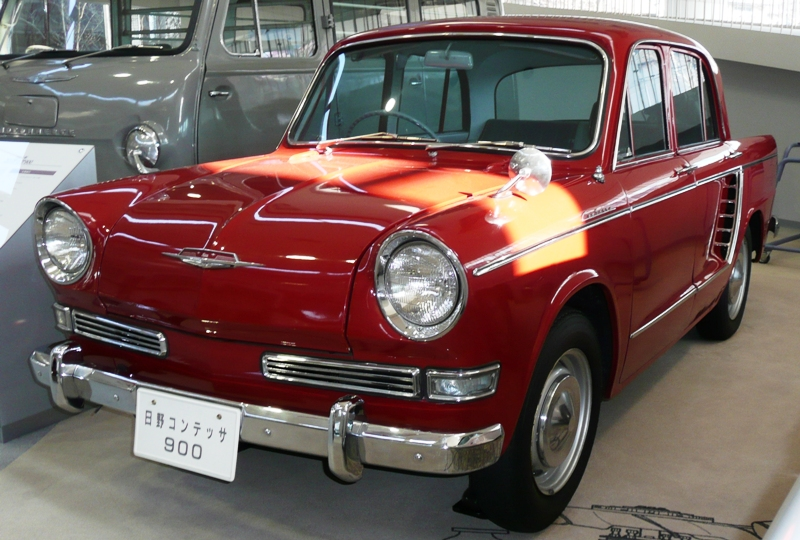
Hino Contessa 900 sedan

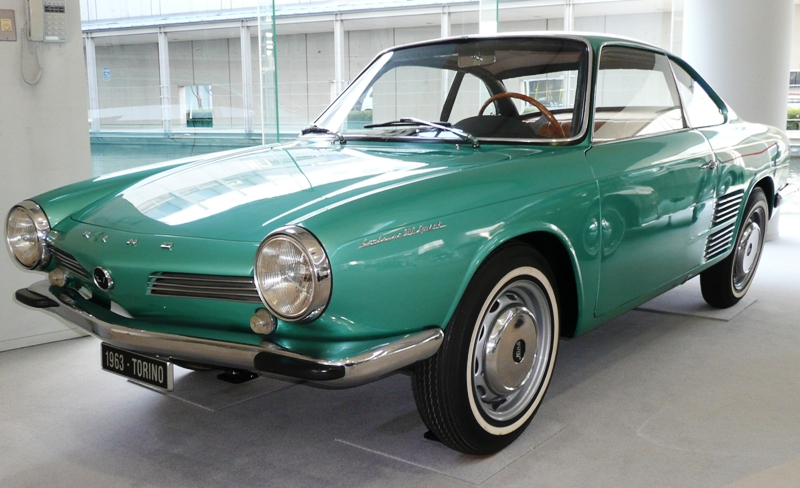
Hino Contessa 900 Sprint

== PD series (1964–1967) ==
Contessa (PD series)
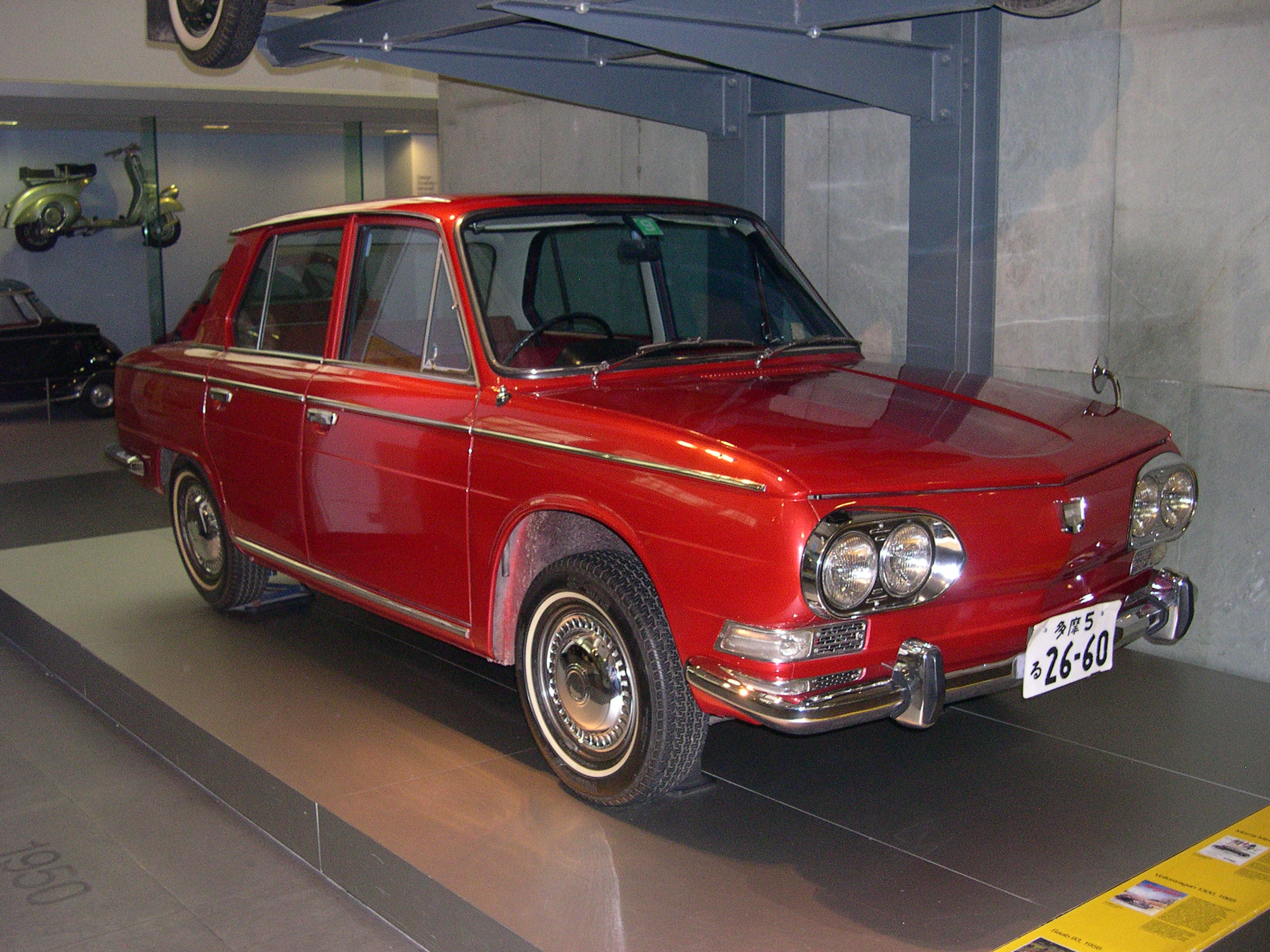
- Contessa 1300 Deluxe sedan (PD100)

Overview
- Manufacturer: Hino Motors
- Production: September 1964 – October 1969
- Assembly: Hamura, Tokyo, Japan; Haifa, Israel (Autocars); Thames, New Zealand (Campbell Motors)
- Designer: Giovanni Michelotti (coupe)

Body and chassis
- Class: compact
- Body style: 2-door coupé; 4-door sedan
- Layout: RR layout
- Platform: PD 100/200/300/400
- Related: Hino/Toyota Briska; Renault 8

Powertrain
- Engine: 1251 cc GR100 I4
- Transmission: 3/4-speed manual

Dimensions
- Wheelbase: 2,280 mm (89.8 in)
- Length: 4,150 mm (163.4 in)
- Width: 1,530 mm (60.2 in)
- Height: 1,390 mm (54.7 in)
- Curb weight: 888–940 kg (1,958–2,072 lb)

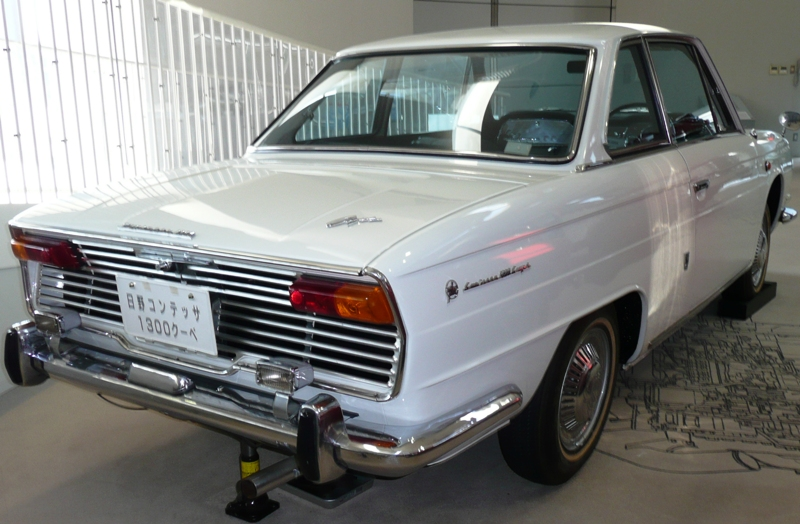
Hino Contessa 1300 coupé (PD300)

The second generation Contessa debuted in September 1964, with exterior design by Giovanni Michelotti on the Contessa Coupe, (who had sold a very similar design to Triumph for their 1300). While considerably longer and heavier, the PD Contessa also had a much more powerful 1,251 cc four-cylinder engine with five main bearings ("GR100", 55 PS or 40 kW or 54 hp). With a four-speed manual transmission, top speed is 130 km/h (81 mph). A handsome coupé version was presented in April 1965; the coupé benefitted from an upgraded engine with twin carburetors and slightly higher compression and 65 PS (48 kW; 64 hp) from November of the same year. With chassis code PD300/400 (versus PD100/200 for the regular sedan), this sporting version was marketed as the "1300S". There was also an LPG-powered version in Standard or Deluxe trim; in this specification the engine produces 52 PS (38 kW) at 5000 rpm.

100 and 300-series are right-hand drive, while 200 and 400-series are left-hand drive. The use of twin headlights does contribute to a mild similarity to the Renault 8, and the second generation Chevrolet Corvair, and the lack of a front grille because the Contessa, Renault and the Corvair are both rear engined and rear cooled (air for the Corvair, water for the Contessa and Renault). Early Standard versions did not receive bumper horns and were fitted with single front headlamps with blanks where the second set would have gone. Later on, the Standard (of which very few survive) received the same headlamps and bumpers as the De Luxe, albeit with painted rather than chromed bumpers.

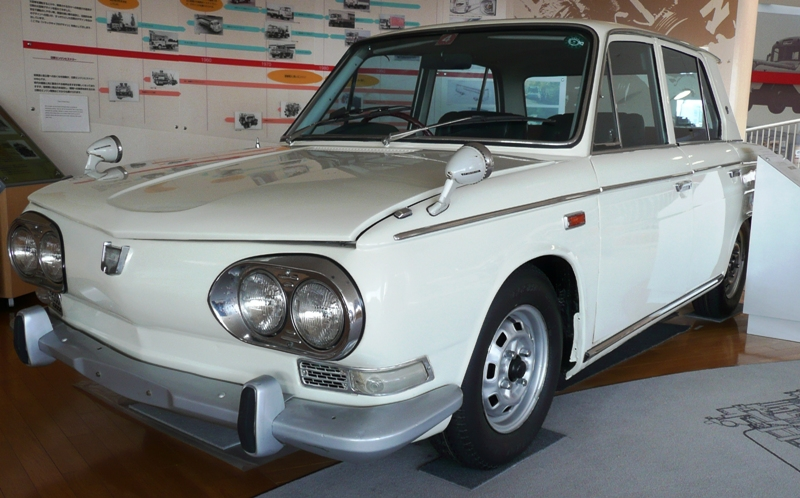
Later 1300 Standard sedan, with twin headlamps and painted bumpers

This generation of the Contessa was also exported to Australia, Switzerland, and the Netherlands amongst others. As a part of this export drive, the Contessa also saw local assembly in New Zealand (by Campbell Motors, around 600 are thought to have been assembled there) and in Israel (by Autocars). 55,027 PD Contessas were built, of which 3,868 were Coupés. As of 2007, only 105 Contessas remained on the road in Japan, although many New Zealand-built cars are exported back to Japan. While series production ground to a halt in March 1967 following Hino's strategic alliance with Toyota in late 1966, assembly of existing shells and parts continued at a slow pace into the summer of 1968, with ever-higher Toyota parts content. A further 175 were built in October 1969, as part of a final disposal of stock. As production of the Contessa began to wind down towards discontinuation, the Hamura factory was reprioritized to produce the Toyota Hilux pickup truck, and the Toyota Publica truck, then later was used to manufacture the Toyota Sprinter.

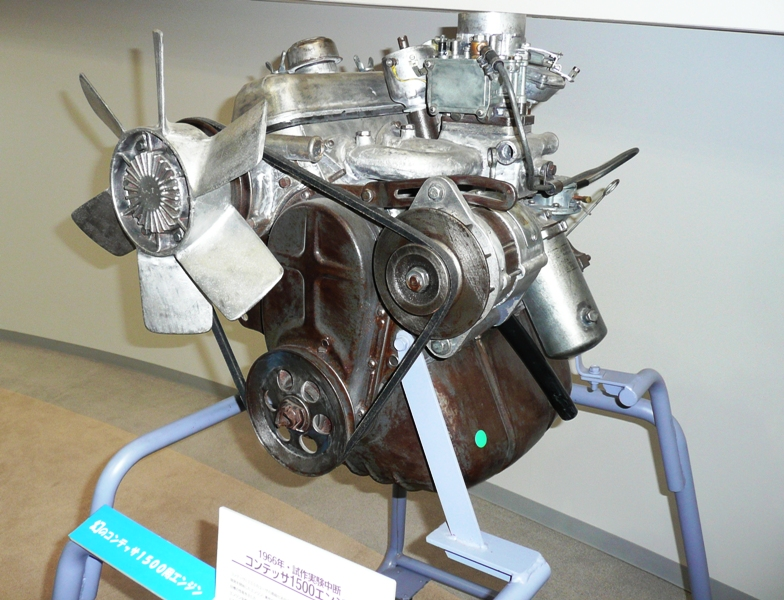
Hino Contessa 1500 engine

The earlier column-mounted three-speed manual continued to be available in the sedans, while a floor-mounted four-speed manual was standard in coupés and an option in the sedans. A bored out 1.5 litre version of the GR100 engine was developed in 1966, but after the strategic alliance with Toyota the project was shelved. Codenamed YE30, this 1471 cc engine produced 70 PS (51 kW) in standard trim. The projected Coupé version of the engine (YE36) was to produce 80 PS (59 kW) and a twin-cam version was to offer 90 PS (66 kW). As Toyota began to assume operations of Hino assets and manufacturing resources, Toyota was also concentrating their efforts of introducing a Contessa sized coupe and sedan of their own, and in 1966 introduced the Toyota Corolla.

In an effort to prepare the US market in advance of a planned entry, Hino had Pete Brock and his BRE Racing team prepare two Contessa sedans for competition. One won a surprise victory at the 1966 LA Times Grand Prix. Later, Brock raced the lighter and faster Coupé version, called the "Samurai". The Contessas also saw a lot of local competition in Japan, and to aid this effort 20 of the lightened Hino Contessa 1300 L (for "Lightened") were built in 1966. These were built with thinner sheet metal and missing some equipment, such as hubcaps and sound deadening.

== Israel ==
Hino Motors signed a 10-year assembly agreement with Kaiser-Illin Industries of Haifa, Israel, in 1963. Assembly of the Contessa 900 started in 1964. Later, Briska 900 and 1300 and the Contessa 1300 sedan were assembled in Haifa as well. From 1964 to 1965, Israel was Hino's second most important market for its Contessas. Israel exports amounted to circa 10 percent of total Contessa production. After Hino was purchased by Toyota, the contract was terminated and the very last Israeli Contessas rolled off the assembly line in March 1968. In total, over 8,000 Hino Contessa and Briska were assembled in Israel.
