= Hino Briska =

Overview
- Manufacturer: Hino Motors
- Production: April 1961–1968

Body and chassis
- Class: compact truck
- Body style: pickup delivery van (1960–1962)
- Layout: FR layout
- Related: Hino Contessa; Hino Commerce

Chronology
- Successor: Toyota Hilux

The Hino Briska (Japanese: 日野・ブリスカ) was a small pickup truck built by Hino Motors, adapted from the Renault-based Hino Contessa sedan. It was introduced in 1961 and remained in production until 1968, when Toyota released the Toyota Hilux. In 1967, the Hino Briska was renamed the Toyota Briska, then the Hilux was introduced, based on the Briska. There was also a commercial delivery van, appropriately called the Hino Commerce.

== FG series (1961–1965) ==
FG series
- 1961-1963 Hino Briska pickup (FG10)

Overview
- Manufacturer: Hino Motors
- Production: April 1961–1965
- Assembly: Japan: Tokyo (Mitsui Seiki); Israel: Haifa (Kaiser-Illin Industries)

Powertrain
- Engine: 893 cc GP20 I4
- Transmission: 4-speed manual

Dimensions
- Wheelbase: 2,230 mm (87.8 in) (FG10/FG20); 2,295 mm (90.4 in) (FG30)
- Length: 3,840–4,150 mm (151.2–163.4 in)
- Width: 1,620 mm (63.8 in)
- Height: 1,640 mm (64.6 in)
- Curb weight: 935 kg (2,061 lb)

Chronology
- Successor: FH series

The Briska was introduced in March 1961 at exhibitions in 32 cities across Japan. Called the FG10, it used a Hitachi-Stromberg carburetor on a modified version of the Contessa's engine, itself derived from that of the Renault 4CV. In March 1962, the Briska lineup added a longer version with a second bench seat for rear seat passengers. This was coded FG20P and was also available in a glazed van version ("Light Van"), called FG20V. The Briska was built under contract by Mitsui Seiki rather than by Hino themselves from the beginning.

The body style with the single bench seat could carry a payload of 750 kg (1,653 lb), while the Pickup (crew cab with an integrated bed) could accommodate 400 kg (882 lb). In September 1962 the longer FG30 arrived (with a corresponding update to the Light Van and Pickup in 1963 as the FG30P and V), now on a slightly longer wheelbase and upgraded for a 850 kg (1,874 lb) payload. The Light Van and Pickup received new rear bodywork, more standardized and simplified compared to that of the earlier models. The Briska was the first Japanese produced truck to accommodate three passengers on a single bench seat, according to the Japanese Governments Ministry of Posts and Telecommunications. The light delivery van (FG20V/FG30V) was only built for two years due to lack of sales. In 1963, the engine was uprated from the original 35 PS (26 kW; 35 bhp) to 40 PS (29 kW; 39 bhp). This also meant that top speed increased, from 91 to 100 km/h (57 to 62 mph).

In October 1963 the original Briska was facelifted, with a new front clip with a rather ornate front grille with a row of five diamond-shaped openings across the center. This model was briefly built as the FG30V Light Van and FG30P Pickup as well; for the last year of production only the Briska truck was available. A total of 33,916 Briska 900 were built.

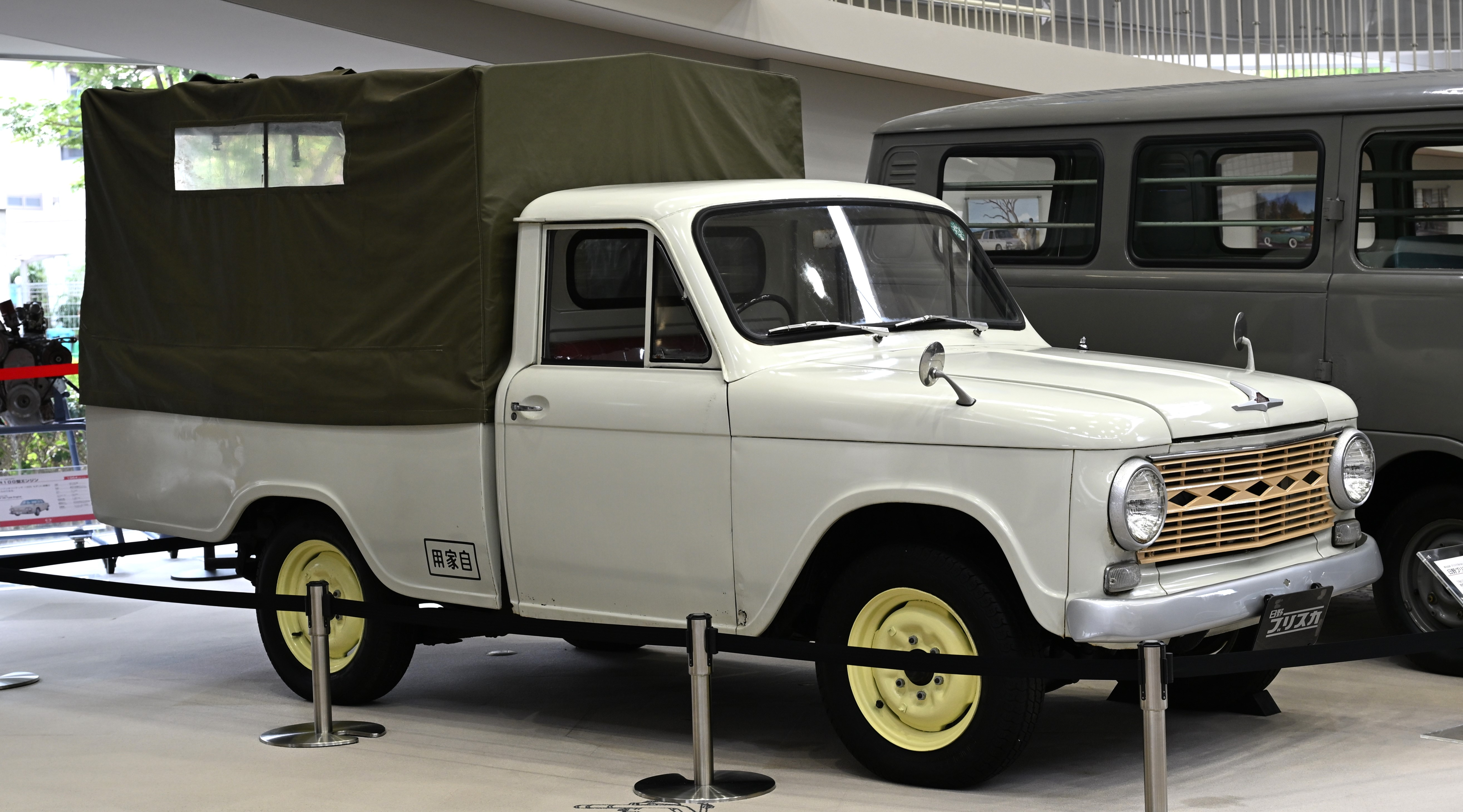
1962 Hino Briska 900

== FH series (1965–1968) ==
FH100/GY10
- 1965 Hino Briska 1300 (FH100)

Overview
- Manufacturer: Hino Motors
- Also called: Toyota Briska
- Production: 1965–1967 (Hino); 1967–1968 (Toyota)
- Assembly: Japan: Tokyo (Mitsui Seiki); Japan: Hamura, Tokyo (Toyota Briska); Israel: Haifa

Powertrain
- Engine: 1251 cc GR100 I4 (FH100); 1251 cc G I4 (GY10)
- Transmission: 4-speed manual

Dimensions
- Wheelbase: 2,520 mm (99.2 in)
- Length: 4,275 mm (168.3 in)
- Width: 1,640 mm (64.6 in)
- Height: 1,595 mm (62.8 in)
- Curb weight: 1,080 kg (2,381 lb)

Chronology
- Predecessor: FG series
- Successor: Toyota Hilux

When the Contessa entered its second generation, the Briska was also modified and received a larger 1251 cc engine with 55 PS (40 kW). There was only a single bodystyle available of the second generation, but payload increased to 1 tonne (2,200 lb). The new Briska appeared in April 1965. Hino entered into a partnership with Toyota in 1966, with Hino focusing on large commercial trucks and Toyota focusing on lighter vehicles. The four-speed manual transmission received synchronization only on the top three gears. 15,036 Hino Briska 1300 were built; this does not include Toyota-badged cars.

The second generation Briska continued to be built by Mitsui Seiki rather than by Hino themselves, until after the Toyota takeover. Toyota moved Briska production (with their own badges) from the Mitsui plant into Hino's own Hamura factory to replace the Contessa after it was discontinued in March 1967.

As of 12 May 1967 and until the end of production in March 1968 the truck was sold as the Toyota Briska, using the model code GY10. The Toyota Briska received twin headlights and a slightly more powerful engine with 63 PS (46 kW; 62 bhp). The engine modifications had originally been developed for the Contessa but only the Toyota Briska ended up benefitting from them. Production of the Toyota Briska totalled 10,000 units in a little under a year; the Hilux succeeded the Briska on Hino's production line while Hino's truck sales were still low.

== Israel ==
Hino Motors signed a 10-year assembly agreement with Kaiser-Illin Industries of Haifa, Israel, in 1963. Assembly of the Contessa 900 started in 1964. Later, the Briska 900 and 1300 and the Contessa 1300 sedan were assembled in Haifa as well. During the years 1964 and 1965, Israel was Hino's second most important market for its Contessas. Israel exports amounted to about ten percent of the total Contessa production. Israeli-built Contessas were even exported to Greece, beginning towards the end of 1965. After Hino was purchased by Toyota, the contract was terminated and the final Israeli Contessas rolled off the assembly line in March 1968. In total, over 8,000 Hino Contessa and Briska were assembled in Israel.

== Commerce ==
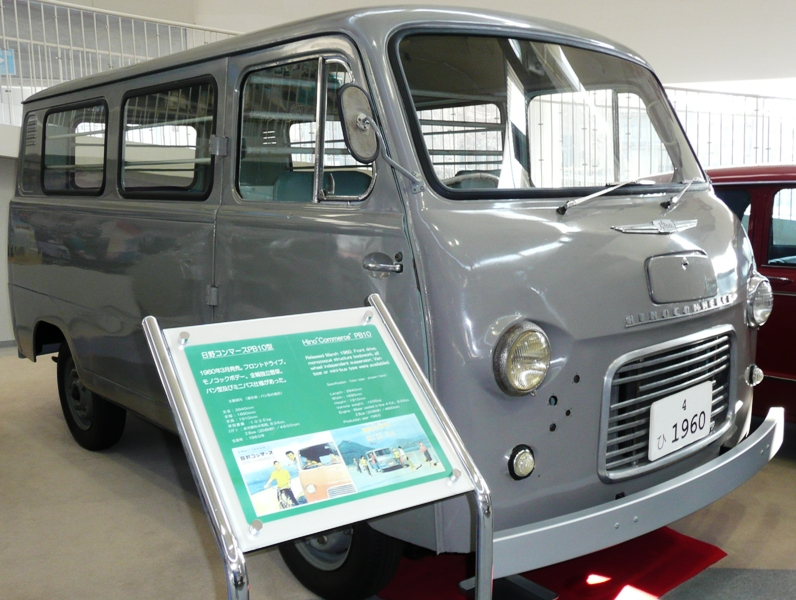
Hino Commerce delivery van built on Hino Briska chassis.

The Briska was actually pre-dated by a commercial delivery van version called the Hino Commerce (model code PB), introduced in 1959. The Commerce was similar mechanically to the Renault Estafette (which was also based on the Renault 4CV). At the time, Hino built three vehicles with three different layouts, while sharing engines and some other mechanicals: the Briska was front engine and rear-wheel drive, whereas the Commerce is front engined and front-wheel drive, and the Contessa is rear-engined and rear-wheel drive.
