= Standard SC engine =

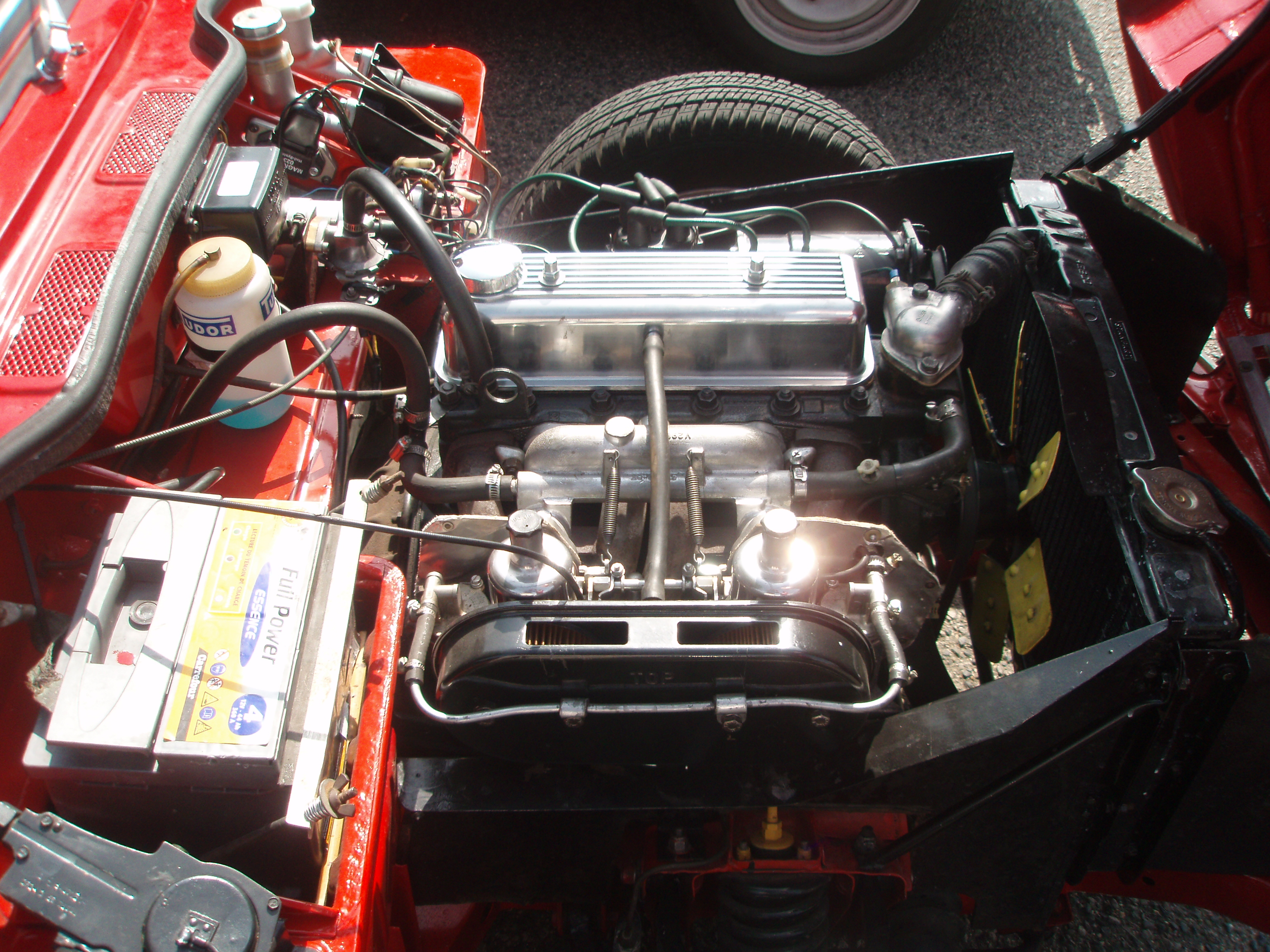

Overview
- Manufacturer: Standard Triumph; Leyland Motors; British Leyland
- Also called: Triumph OHV; Triumph 1300; Triumph 1500
- Production: 1953-1980

Layout
- Configuration: I4
- Displacement: 803 cc (49.0 cu in); 948 cc (57.9 cu in); 1,147 cc (70.0 cu in); 1,296 cc (79.1 cu in); 1,493 cc (91.1 cu in)
- Cylinder block material: Iron
- Cylinder head material: Iron
- Valvetrain: OHV

Combustion
- Fuel system: Carburettor
- Fuel type: Petrol
- Oil system: Wet sump
- Cooling system: Water-cooled

Output
- Power output: 27 - 75 bhp

Chronology
- Predecessor: Standard 8 hp Sidevalve

The Standard SC engine is a cast-iron overhead valve straight-four engine designed and initially produced by Standard Triumph. Over its production life displacement grew from an initial size of just over 800 cc to nearly 1500 cc. Introduced in the Standard Eight in 1953, it would eventually be used in a wide range of vehicles from Standard, Triumph, and MG.

== Origin ==
In 1948 a "single model" policy was instituted at Standard, centred on the Standard Vanguard. Standard Triumph chairman John Black nevertheless wanted to add a new model below the existing Vanguard in the company's lineup, and so work had started in 1950/1951 on a new car and engine to power it, both of which were named "SC" for "small car". The car would face competition in the marketplace from the recently introduced Ford Anglia, Austin A30, and Morris Minor. Consideration was given to using the existing Vanguard engine, but this linered engine proved too expensive for the intended market. The engine designed for the new small car would use the tooling installed to produce the engine for the Triumph Mayflower, and so would have to have the same bore centres as that earlier design. Austin's new A-series engine and the original Standard SC shared the same bore and stroke and displacement, leading some to wonder if Standard engineers had copied the Austin design for their own. Significant differences between the engines, including the number and placement of intake and exhaust ports and the ability of the SC to be expanded to nearly 1.5 L, make this unlikely.

== Model history ==
=== 800 ===
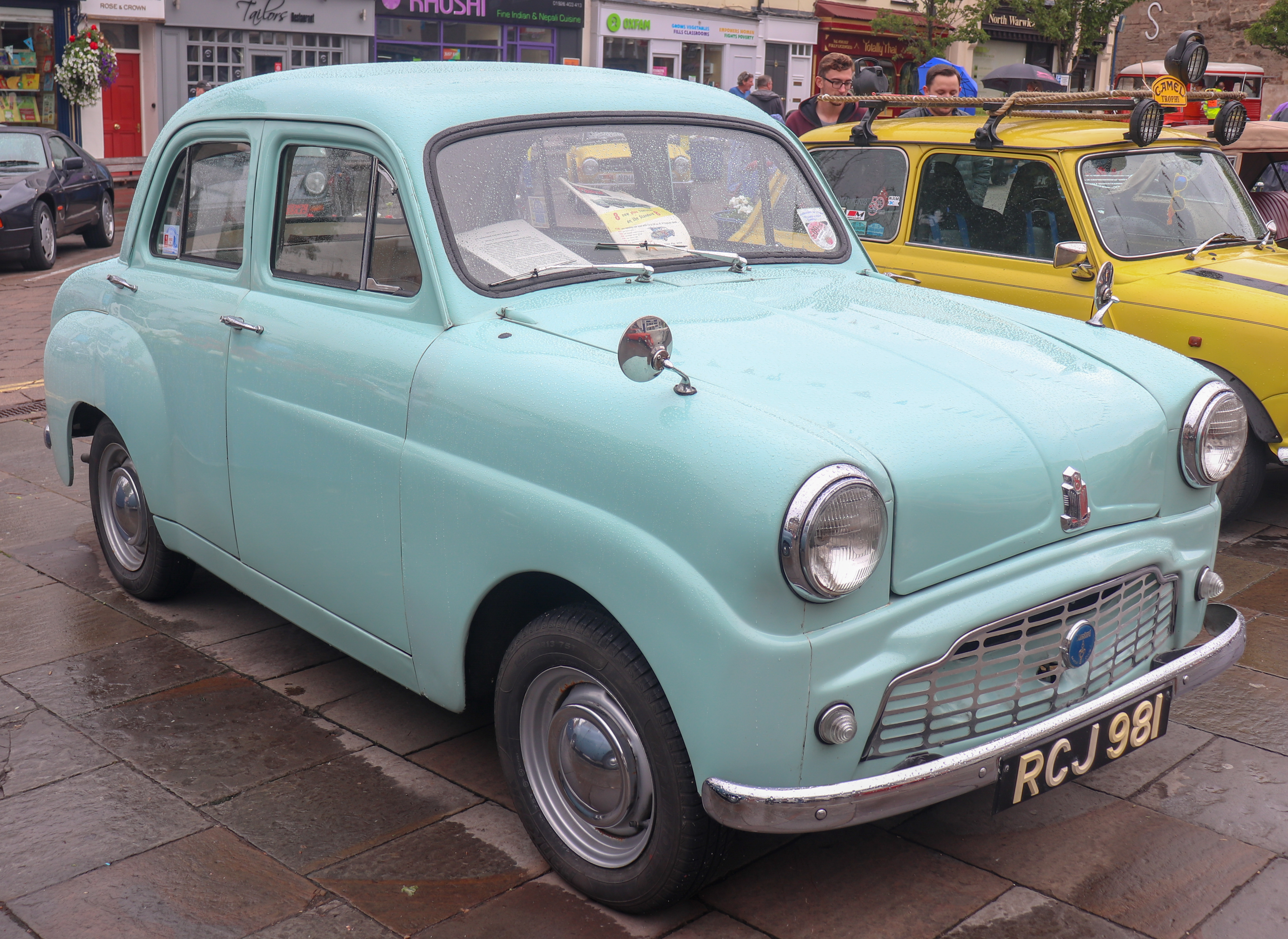
Standard Eight, the first car to use the Standard SC engine

The new engine first appeared in the Standard Eight in 1953. With a displacement of 803 cc (49.0 cu in) the engine produced 26 bhp (19.4 kW) at 4500 rpm. By 1957 power had increased to 30 bhp (22.4 kW) at 5000 rpm.

=== 950 ===
In 1954 the Standard Ten was introduced as a more well-appointed version of the Standard Eight, while sharing the earlier car's frame and transmission. The engine for the Ten was enlarged to 948 cc (57.9 cu in) and developed 33 bhp (24.6 kW). By the time the Standard Pennant, a revised Ten with tail-fins and optional two-tone paint schemes, was launched in October 1957, output of the 948 cc engine had increased to 37 bhp (27.6 kW).

This engine was fitted to new Triumph Herald in 1959. Power in this model was claimed to be 34.5 bhp (25.7 kW).

=== 1150 ===
Standard-Triumph was taken over by Leyland Motors in 1961, which made available new resources to develop the Herald. The car was re-launched in April 1961 with an 1,147 cc (70.0 cu in) engine as the Herald 1200. To gain the extra displacement the cylinders were placed out of centre which cleared the studs so that a bigger bore could be used. Twin carburettors were no longer standard fitment to any of the range, although they remained an option. The standard was a single down-draught Solex carburettor. Claimed maximum power of the Herald 1200 was 39 bhp (29.1 kW). An upmarket version, the Herald 12/50, was offered from 1963 to 1967 and featured a tuned engine with a claimed output of 51 bhp (38.0 kW).

The 1147 cc version of the engine was also used in the first model of the Triumph Spitfire. Mildly tuned and fed by twin SU carburettors, in UK tune the in-line four produced 63 bhp (47.0 kW) at 5,750 rpm, and 67 lb⋅ft (90.8 N⋅m) of torque at 3,500 rpm.

A special light-alloy 8-port racing cylinder head used on the later Le Mans and Macau Spitfires' 1147 cc engines was labelled "70X". A version of this head for the later 1296 cc engine was labelled "79X", the numbers representing the displacement of the engines in cubic inches.

=== 1300 ===
In 1965 the engine was enlarged from 1147 cc to 1,296 cc (79.1 cu in), with the increase coming from a change in bore from 69.3 mm (2.73 in) to 73.7 mm (2.90 in) while stroke remained at 76 mm (3.0 in). This version was fitted to the new Triumph Herald 13/60 and Triumph 1300 saloons. When it debuted in the Triumph 1300 with a single Stromberg CD150 carburettor it developed 61 hp (45.5 kW) due to the adoption of the German DIN rating system; the actual output was the same for the early Mark IV. The less powerful North American version still used a single Zenith Stromberg carburettor and an 8.5:1 compression ratio. Displacement remained at 1296 cc, but in 1973 larger big-end bearings were fitted to rationalise production with the TR6 2.5 L engines. Some detuning was also done to meet new emissions laws. These changes somewhat dampened its previously high-revving nature

=== 1500 ===
Another change to the SC inline 4 came in 1970 when its stroke was increased from 76 mm (3.0 in) to 87.5 mm (3.44 in), increasing displacement to 1,493 cc (91.1 cu in). Debuting in the front-wheel drive Triumph 1500 with a single SU carburettor, power output was 61 bhp (45.5 kW). Later used in the Triumph Spitfire 1500, this final incarnation of the engine was rather rough and more prone to failure than the earlier models, although torque was greatly increased. While most export-market Spitfire 1500s had a compression ratio reduced to 8.0:1, the American market model was fitted with a single Zenith-Stromberg carburettor and a compression ratio reduced to 7.5:1 to allow it to run on lower octane unleaded fuel. After adding a catalytic converter and exhaust gas recirculating system, the US market engine only delivered 53 bhp (39.5 kW). The notable exception to this was the 1976 model year, when the compression ratio was raised to 9.1:1. This improvement was short-lived, however, as the ratio was again reduced to 7.5:1 for the remaining years of production.

The UK received the most powerful variant of all. Aided by a 9:1 compression ratio, less restrictive emissions control equipment, and two Type HS4 SU carburettors in place of the smaller Type HS2s, the Spitfire 1500 engine produced 71 hp (52.9 kW) at 5,500 rpm, and 82 lb⋅ft (111.2 N⋅m) of torque at 3,000 rpm.

The 1500 engine was also used in the MG Midget 1500 (1974–80) coupled to a modified Morris Marina gearbox.

== Design ==
Design of the engine was headed by David Eley, a long-time Standard employee. The engine had a cast-iron block and cylinder head, and a pressed-steel sump. Spark-plugs and camshaft were on the left side of the engine, while the inlet and exhaust manifolds were on the right. The camshaft, which drove the distributor and oil pump through a spur gear, was itself chain-driven off the nose of the crankshaft, with the drive covered by a pressed-steel cover. The cylinder head had four inlet and four outlet ports, in contrast to some of its competitors who had some ports siamesed. The crankshaft was carried in three main bearings. Crankshaft and connecting rods were steel, while the pistons were light alloy. The ancillaries were mounted on the left side of the engine, while the water pump and thermostat were in a separate casting attached to the front of the engine.

Factory Quoted Power Chart
Model	Quoted power at rpm	Quoted torque at rpm	Capacity	Fueling System	Year
Standard Eight	26 bhp at 4,500 rpm		803 cc		1953
Standard Ten			948 cc		1954
Standard Eight	30 bhp at 5,000 rpm		803 cc		1957
Standard Pennant	37 bhp		948 cc		1957
Triumph Herald	34.5 bhp		948 cc		1959
Triumph Herald S	34.5 bhp		948 cc		1961
Triumph Herald 1200	39 bhp		1147 cc	Single down-draught Solex carburettor	1961
Triumph Spitfire 4	63 bhp at 5,750 rpm	67 lb⋅ft at 3,500 rpm	1147 cc	Twin SU carburettors	1962
Triumph Herald 12/50	51 bhp		1147 cc		1963
Bond Equipe GT	63 bhp		1147 cc		1963
Bond Equipe GT4S	67 bhp		1147 cc		1964
Triumph 1300	61 bhp		1296 cc	Single Stromberg CD150 carburettor	1965
Triumph Spitfire Mark II	67 bhp at 6,000 rpm		1147 cc		1965
Triumph Herald 13/60	61 bhp		1296 cc	Single Stromberg CD150 carburettor	1967
Bond Equipe GT4S 1300	75 bhp		1296 cc		1967
Spitfire Mark III	75 bhp at 6,000 rpm	75 lb⋅ft at 4,000 rpm	1296 cc	Twin SU carburettors	1967
Triumph 1300TC	75 bhp		1296 cc	Twin SU carburettors	1968
Triumph 1500	61 bhp		1493 cc		1970
Triumph Toledo	58 bhp		1296 cc		1970
Triumph Spitfire Mark IV (UK)	63 bhp (DIN)		1296 cc	Twin SU HS2 carburettor	1970
Triumph Spitfire Mark IV (US)			1296 cc	Single Zenith Stromberg carburettor	1970
Triumph Toledo special export	61 bhp		1493 cc		1971
Triumph Toledo special export TC	64 bhp		1493 cc		1971
Triumph 1500TC			1493 cc	Twin SU carburettors	1973
Triumph Spitfire 1500 (UK)	71 bhp (DIN)		1493 cc	Twin SU HS4 carburettors	1974
Triumph Spitfire 1500 (US)	53 bhp		1493 cc	Single Zenith-Stromberg carburettor	1974
MG Midget 1500 (UK)	65 bhp		1493 cc	Twin SU HS4 carburettors	1974
MG Midget 1500 (US)	50 bhp at 5,000 rpm	67 lb⋅ft at 2,500 rpm	1493 cc	Single Zenith-Stromberg 150 CD4T	1974
Triumph Dolomite 1300			1296 cc		1976
Triumph Dolomite 1500			1493 cc	Twin SU carburettors	1976
Triumph Dolomite 1500HL			1493 cc	Twin SU carburettors	1976

== Inline 6 ==
An inline six cylinder engine was developed from the SC four. The Standard Triumph Six first appeared in 1960 in the Standard Vanguard Six. It had a 74.6 mm (2.9 in) bore and a 76 mm (3.0 in) stroke, giving a capacity of 1,998 cc (121.9 cu in).

The engine was next used in the Triumph Vitesse, a sports saloon based on the Herald, in 1962. In this application the engine had a 66.75 mm (2.6 in) bore, reducing displacement to 1,596 cc (97.4 cu in). The Vitesse got the 2 L engine in 1966.

The Triumph 2000 replaced the Vanguard Six in 1963 when Leyland discontinued the Standard marque. The 2 L six was later used in the Spitfire-based GT6 coupé from 1966 to 1974.

In 1967 the engine replaced the Standard inline-four in the new Triumph TR5 and TR250 models. For this application the stroke was increased to 95 mm (3.7 in), raising displacement to 2,498 cc (152.4 cu in).

This engine was succeeded by the Leyland PE 146 and PE 166 engines designed by Triumph for the new Rover SD1. Although the earliest proposals for this project were for a new overhead camshaft cylinder-head on the original block, limitations in the Triumph block caused this option to be rejected, and the new OHC six shared no parts with the old Triumph engine.

== Reliant 3-wheeler engines ==
In 1959, the Reliant Motor Company in Tamworth, Staffordshire, began development of a 600cc OHV engine for their forthcoming Regal Mark VII (TW7) model. This engine was a reverse-engineered, all-alloy version of the Standard SC engine, taken from a contemporary Chinese design which had been developed on exported Standard tooling.

The engine was released in 600cc form in 1962, becoming Britain's first mass produced all-alloy car engine. Capacity was increased to 701cc in 1968, powering the Reliant Rebel (a 4-wheel model) and Bond Bug. In 1972, capacity was increased again to 748cc for the new Robin range, and finally to 848cc in 1975 for the Robin, Kitten (4-wheeler), and later Rialto ranges.

The Reliant engine ceased production in 2002, over 20 years after the cessation of the Standard SC engine.

== Replacement ==
Although never directly replaced by another engine in the Triumph Spitfire, the SC was superseded by the Triumph slant-four as the premier power unit in the higher specification Dolomites.
