= Le Compte =

Le Compte, LeCompte or Lecompte may refer to:

== People ==
- Ben LeCompte (born 1993), American college football punter
- Elizabeth LeCompte (born 1944), American director of experimental theater, dance and media
- Herman Le Compte, (1929–2008), Belgian physician
- Joseph Lecompte (1797–1851), American politician
- Karl M. LeCompte (1887–1972), American congressman
- Marie Le Compte, American journal editor and anarchist active during the early 1880s
- Samuel Dexter Lecompte (1814–1888), American judge and proslavery activist

== Other uses ==
- Lecompte, Louisiana, United States, a town
- Lecompte High School, Lecompte, Louisiana, a former school, now on the National Register of Historic Places
- Le Compte Wildlife Management Area, Dorchester County, Maryland, United States

== See also ==
- Comte (disambiguation)
