= Conte =

Conte may refer to:

- Conte (literature), a literary genre
- Conte (surname)
- Conté, a drawing medium
- Conte, Jura, town in France
- Conté royal family, a fictional family in Tamora Pierce's Tortallan world
- Conte, or konto, a style of Japanese comedy
- Conte, the title of Count in Italy and other European countries
- Antonio Conte, Italian football manager

== See also ==
- Comté
- Contes (disambiguation)
- Contessa (disambiguation)
- Del Conte (disambiguation)
