= Barefoot Contessa (band) =

- Origin: UK
- Genres: Indie, country blues
- Years active: 1994–2001
- Labels: Indie 500 Records, Global Warming
- Past members: Graham Gargiulo; Helene Dineen; Dinesh Bhatt; Andy Kingston; James Corner

Barefoot Contessa were a UK indie band active in the late 1990s. Their music was blues-tinged country, a style which would later become known as Americana.

The band formed in London in 1994 after Helene Dineen and Graham Gargiulo met at a PJ Harvey concert.

Early in their career they received UK-wide radio airplay on BBC Radio 1 courtesy of Mark Radcliffe for whom they recorded a couple of live sessions in 1995 and 1996. In 1997 they performed live on BBC Radio 4's Kaleidoscope.

They disbanded after the release of their fourth studio album, however, in 2002, several members of Barefoot Contessa formed a new band named Helene. Singer Helene Dineen later explained the significance of the change of name, saying "there was a shift in the musical direction at that time. It seemed right to acknowledge it and start afresh".

== Discography ==
Barefoot Contessa released four albums, one EP and one single.

=== Studio albums ===
- Barefoot Contessa (1995)
- You Can't Go Home Again (1996)
- Blues for a Honey (1999)
- Oh, the Sweet Power! (2000)

=== Singles & EPs ===
- To Be Continued (Definitive Version) (1995)
- Happy Together EP (1997)
