= Fabienne Comte =

French statistician

Fabienne Comte is a French statistician known for her research on topics including statistical finance, stochastic volatility, autoregressive conditional heteroskedasticity, and deconvolution. She is a professor in the unit for mathematics and computer science at the University of Paris.

== Education and career ==
Comte studied mathematics at ENS Cachan and Paris-Sud University, earning a licentiate in 1988, a master's degree in 1989, and an agrégation in 1990, with a specialty in probability. She earned a diplôme d'études approfondies in 1991, through a cooperative program with Paris 1 Panthéon-Sorbonne University, the École Polytechnique, and ENSAE ParisTech, and completed her doctorate in applied mathematics in 1994 through Paris 1 with the thesis Causalité, Cointégration, Mémoire Longue : Modélisation Stochastique en temps continu, estimation et simulation, supervised by mathematical economist Eric Renault.

She worked as maître de conférences at Pierre and Marie Curie University from 1995 until 2001, earning a habilitation there in 2000. In 2001 became professor at Paris Descartes University, which merged into the University of Paris in 2019.

== Book ==
Comte is the author of the book Estimation non-paramétrique [Nonparametric estimation], published in 2015.
