= Contes =

Contes may refer to:

- Contes, Alpes-Maritimes, a commune in the Alpes-Maritimes department in France
- Contes, Pas-de-Calais, a commune in the Pas-de-Calais department in France

== See also ==
- Conte (disambiguation)
