= Maureen Conte =

Marine biogeochemist

- Education: Columbia University
- Scientific career
- Thesis: The biogeochemistry of particulate lipids in warm-core Gulf Stream ring systems (1990)

Maureen Hatcher Conte is biogeochemist known for her work using particles to define the long-term cycling of chemical compounds in seawater.

== Education and career ==
Conte has a B.A. from Johns Hopkins University (1975), and an M.A. (1982), M.Phil. (1987), and Ph.D. (1989) from Columbia University. Her Ph.D. examined lipids found in particles in the Gulf Stream. Following her Ph.D. she conducted postdoctoral work at the University of Bristol before joining Woods Hole Oceanographic Institution in 1994. As of 2022 Conte is a senior scientist at the Bermuda Institute of Ocean Sciences and a fellow at the Marine Biological Laboratory. Conte is the lead investigator for the Ocean Flux Program, a program that has been examining particles in the Sargasso Sea since 1978.

== Research ==
Conte is known for her work on the organic compounds found in particles. Her early work examined the consumption of organic matter, and the development of methods to analyze lipids from seawater. Subsequently, she examined the different types of lipids found in organisms such as coccolithophores. At the Bermuda Atlantic Time-series Study site, Conte has used long-term measurements of particles to quantify changes in the flux of organic carbon to the seafloor over time, and used the presence of alkenones in particles to track changes in ocean temperatures over time. Through her research she has characterized how hurricanes impact the flow of organic carbon to the seafloor, and examined the impact of cold shock on sea turtles that are trapped in cold waters off Cape Cod. Conte's research involves spending extended periods of time on research ships, and in 2020, her research was delayed because she could not collect her samples due to the COVID-19 pandemic.

== Selected publications ==
- Anand, Pallavi; Elderfield, Henry; Conte, Maureen H. (June 2003). "Calibration of Mg/Ca thermometry in planktonic foraminifera from a sediment trap time series: CALIBRATION OF Mg/Ca THERMOMETRY IN PLANKTONIC FORAMINIFERA". Paleoceanography. 18 (2): n/a. Bibcode:2003PalOc..18.1050A. doi:10.1029/2002PA000846.
- Conte, Maureen H.; Sicre, Marie-Alexandrine; Rühlemann, Carsten; Weber, John C.; Schulte, Sonja; Schulz-Bull, Detlef; Blanz, Thomas (February 2006). "Global temperature calibration of the alkenone unsaturation index (U K′ 37 ) in surface waters and comparison with surface sediments: ALKENONE UNSATURATION INDEX". Geochemistry, Geophysics, Geosystems. 7 (2): n/a. doi:10.1029/2005GC001054. hdl:1912/652. S2CID 62825795.
- Conte, Maureen H; Thompson, Anthony; Lesley, David; Harris, Roger P (January 1998). "Genetic and Physiological Influences on the Alkenone/Alkenoate Versus Growth Temperature Relationship in Emiliania huxleyi and Gephyrocapsa Oceanica". Geochimica et Cosmochimica Acta. 62 (1): 51–68. Bibcode:1998GeCoA..62...51C. doi:10.1016/S0016-7037(97)00327-X.
- Medeiros, Patricia M.; Conte, Maureen H.; Weber, John C.; Simoneit, Bernd R. T. (1 March 2006). "Sugars as source indicators of biogenic organic carbon in aerosols collected above the Howland Experimental Forest, Maine". Atmospheric Environment. 40 (9): 1694–1705. Bibcode:2006AtmEn..40.1694M. doi:10.1016/j.atmosenv.2005.11.001. hdl:1912/910. ISSN 1352-2310.
