= Triumph 1300 =

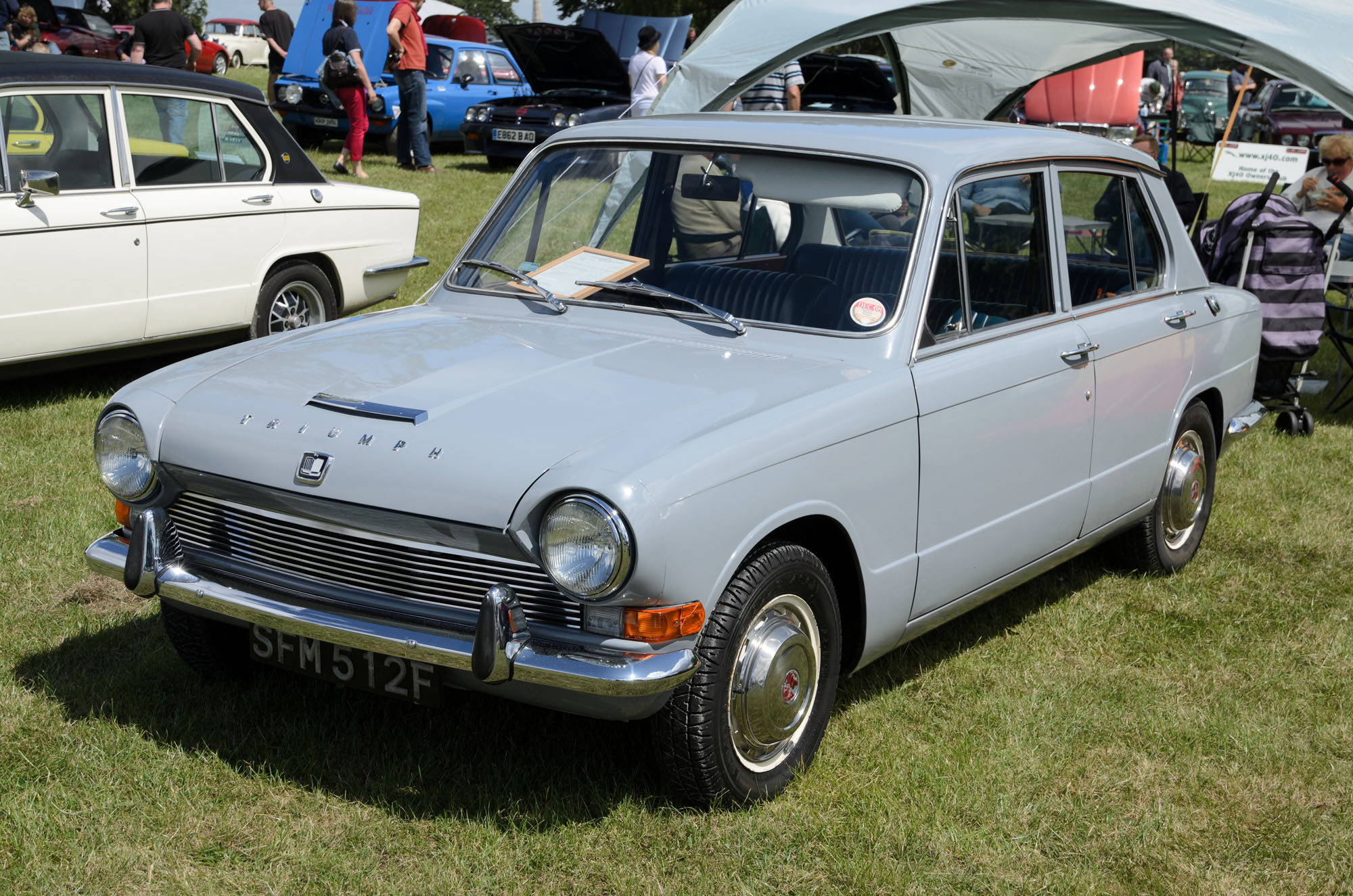

Overview
- Manufacturer: Standard-Triumph (1965–1968); British Leyland (1968–1970)
- Production: 1965–1970; 1300: 113,008 built 1300TC: 35,342 built 1500 (RE): 3,676 built
- Assembly: United Kingdom: Coventry
- Designer: Giovanni Michelotti

Body and chassis
- Body style: 4-door saloon

Powertrain
- Engine: 1,296 cc (79.1 cu in) OHV I4
- Transmission: 4-speed manual all-synchromesh, FWD

Dimensions
- Wheelbase: 96.5 in (2,451 mm)
- Length: 153 in (3,886 mm)
- Width: 61.75 in (1,568 mm)
- Height: 54 in (1,372 mm)

Chronology
- Predecessor: Triumph Herald
- Successor: Triumph Toledo; Triumph 1500

The Triumph 1300 is a medium/small 4-door saloon car that was made between 1965 and 1970 by Standard Triumph in Coventry, England, under the control of Leyland Motors. It was introduced at the London Motor Show in October 1965 and intended as a replacement for the popular Triumph Herald. Its body was designed by Michelotti in a style similar to the larger Triumph 2000. It was replaced by the Triumph 1500, and was re-engineered in the early 1970s to form the basis for the Toledo and Dolomite ranges.

== Equipment ==
The 1300 was Leyland's first front-wheel drive (FWD) design. Their major rival was BMC, who was at the time producing three FWD model ranges including the Mini and the best-selling Austin 1100 series; it was hoped by Leyland that some of the 1100's phenomenal success would rub off on the new Triumph. Triumph decided to adopt a different layout to BMC however, placing the engine above the gearbox in a longitudinal configuration (but not sharing the same oil) rather than BMC's transverse engine layout. This resulted in a tall profile for the engine/gearbox combination which limited styling options. The engine was the same 1296 cc Standard SC unit as used in the Triumph Herald 13/60. (the engine had originated in 1953 in the Standard Eight in 803 cc form) A conventional OHV four-cylinder unit, it developed 61 hp (45 kW) with the single Stromberg CD150 carburettor (also as used in the Herald 13/60) and was mated to a 4-speed all-synchromesh gearbox. Front suspension was by double wishbone layout, attached to a shock-absorber/spring unit, and the rear suspension by semi-trailing arms and coil springs like the 2000.

== Styling ==
Styling was somewhat unusual; partly dictated by the tall engine and gearbox; with a strong family resemblance to the Triumph 2000. The front was a "squashed" version of the 2000 with single headlamps, and the rear had an almost "chopped-off" look with a very short and stubby boot. The roof had a pronounced lip above the rear window. The car was available only as a four-door saloon.

== Interior ==
The interior was well-appointed with full instrumentation in a wooden dashboard, wooden door cappings, adjustable steering column and comfortable seats with ventilated PVC upholstery. There was through-flow ventilation with outlets under the rear roof lip. The car was fairly roomy, and aside from a slightly baulky gearchange, easy to drive with very reasonable performance. Standard equipment was generous and included thick carpeting but no heated backlight. Although not reclining, the front seats were remarkably versatile and could be easily adjusted for height and rake. The steering column was adjustable not only up and down but back and forth as well. From a safety angle the door handles were recessed and could not be caught on clothing and the (awkward to operate) window winders were spring-loaded and similarly recessed. The instrument panel had a speedometer, fuel gauge, temperature gauge, ammeter and a comprehensive cluster of warning lights arranged in a "pie chart" formation. The rear seat had a centre armrest which could be folded up when not in use.

== 1300TC ==
For 1968, the 1300TC joined the basic model. The TC used the engine then fitted in the Triumph Spitfire, which featured twin SU carburetors and in this configuration provided an advertised 75 hp (56 kW). The compression ratio of the TC was 9.0:1, whereas the single carb engine compression was rated 8.5:1 The car was identified by discreet "TC" badges. Top speed was significantly higher than the 1300 at a claimed 90 mph (145 km/h)., and acceleration times were cut by 11 per cent to a 0–50 mph (80 km/h) time of 11.5 seconds. A road test a few months later significantly improved on the company's performance claims, achieving a maximum speed of 93 mph (150 km/h) and 0–50 mph (80 km/h) time of 10.5 seconds. With the car then retailing for a recommended UK price of £909, the road test concluded that "the 1300 TC costs only £41 more than the original model, and is a very good bargain indeed".

== Estate model ==
An estate version of the 1300 reached the concept stages, but was never produced due to budgetary constraints.

== Replacement ==
In August 1970, the 1300 and 1300TC were replaced by the Triumph 1500. The engine was enlarged to 1,493 cc (91.1 cu in), providing a useful increase in torque, but a decrease in overall power and increased fuel consumption. The front end was cleaned up considerably, and the rear redesigned with longer tail, providing a useful increase in boot space. Production of FWD Triumphs ended in 1973.

== Aftermath ==
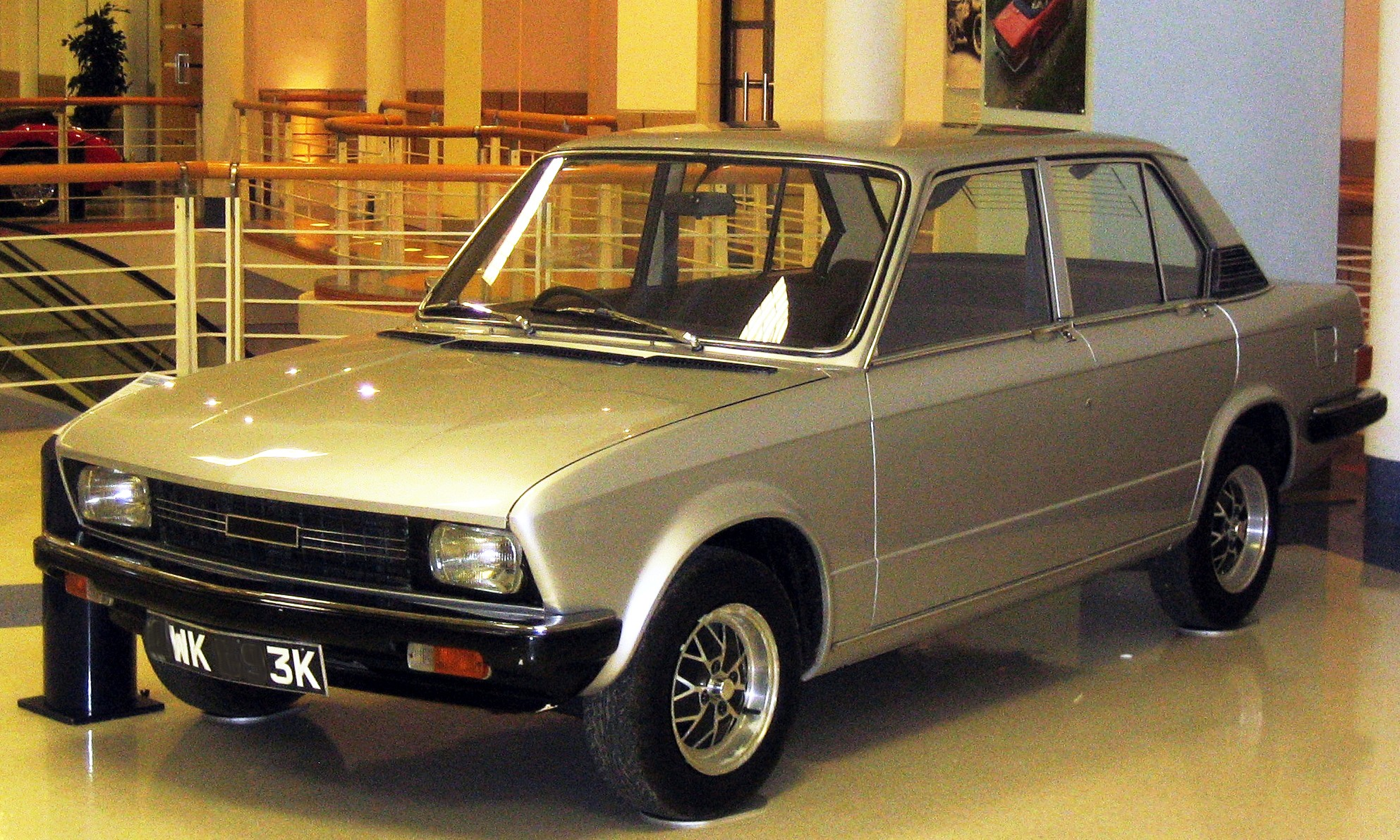
When BLMC upgraded the Triumph 1300 it was apparent that the emphasis had been on minimising cost. Production of this Michelotti proposal would have involved greater tooling and process changes, though the doors and windows appear unchanged.

In many ways, the Triumph 1300 was a failed venture for Triumph and Leyland, as management resources were focused on finding replacements for the successful but ageing Austin-Morris models. Their Triumph-badged 'in-house' competitor failed to achieve anything like the sales figures of the BMC small FWD cars, though the BMC 1100 range featured several badge-engineered variants. Moreover, the front wheel drive configuration failed to realise the handling and road-holding advantages that Triumph had hoped for, and the tall profile limited other uses for the FWD drive train, such as in the Spitfire. The 1300 was well-made and sold reasonably well in the small luxury sector, but after its direct successor was quietly switched to rear wheel drive in 1973, Triumph never designed another FWD car. More significantly, from 1970 the 1300 was re-engineered as a rear-wheel drive car and went on to form the core of Triumph's compact range as the 1300 cc Triumph Toledo (launched in 1971) and the larger engined Triumph Dolomite released in 1972.

Like all Standard-Triumph offerings, DIY servicing was simple: the oil filter could be replaced without jacking the car, the clutch plate could be replaced from inside the car. This simplicity is what made this vehicle stand out from other British made front wheel drive cars. The N/S engine configuration allowed a lot of working space around the engine. The starter was repositioned to the front of the engine and although was a two-minute job to replace, it made the car extremely noisy when starting. It takes its place in history as being the only production car made in Britain to begin life as a front-wheel drive, and end it as a rear-wheel drive. Years later, in the 2000s, MG Rover produced high-performance versions of the Rover 75 and the related MG ZT (which were originally designed as front-wheel drive) which were rear-wheel drive. However, only a small number of these were made, while all other versions of the Rover 75 and MG ZT continued to be front-wheel drive.

The Achilles heel of the 1300 was, primarily the poorly designed suspension wishbone layout and the front stabilizers. Unfortunately, some jobs are very involved: Changing the brake discs, CV joints or front wheel bearings all involve substantial work and should be renewed together if required. engine was too heavy for this particular design and owners found it very frustrating as the rubber bushes had to be changed every few months. Triumph's alternative engineering design answer to the E/W Mini configuration, was a catastrophic failure.

Although the FWD 1300 was something of a disappointment, the basic design went on to provide Triumph with a popular small car until the end of Dolomite production in 1980 and overall, delivered an outstanding return on their original investment.

The Triumph 1300 has a following today in the UK classic car movement, though some parts are now scarce and the number of surviving cars not especially high.

The 1300 was also assembled in Israel by the local partner of Standard-Triumph International, Autocars Co. of Tirat Carmel. However, due to the Israeli government's policy regarding car assembly, Triumph was forced to introduce this vehicle in a 1493 cc version in early 1968, two years ahead of this engine's introduction in the UK. In fact, it was not until another Israeli assembler, Illin Industries, had shut down operations before Triumph could assemble the 1300 in Israel. One curious design offshoot of the 1300 was the "Pony" jeep-like farm vehicle, later renamed "Dragoon". The Pony was exclusively offered for Autocars within the joint venture contract, but very few units were actually produced in Israel, as of 1968. The same 4WD-design was used in a rally version of the Triumph 1300. The rally project enjoyed some success before the vehicle crashed and rolled in 1969. The 4WD Triumph 1300 was subsequently abandoned.

== Production figures ==
- 1300: 113,008
- 1300TC: 35,342
- 1500 (code RE): 3,676
