= Triumph 1500 =

Triumph 1500 & 1500TC
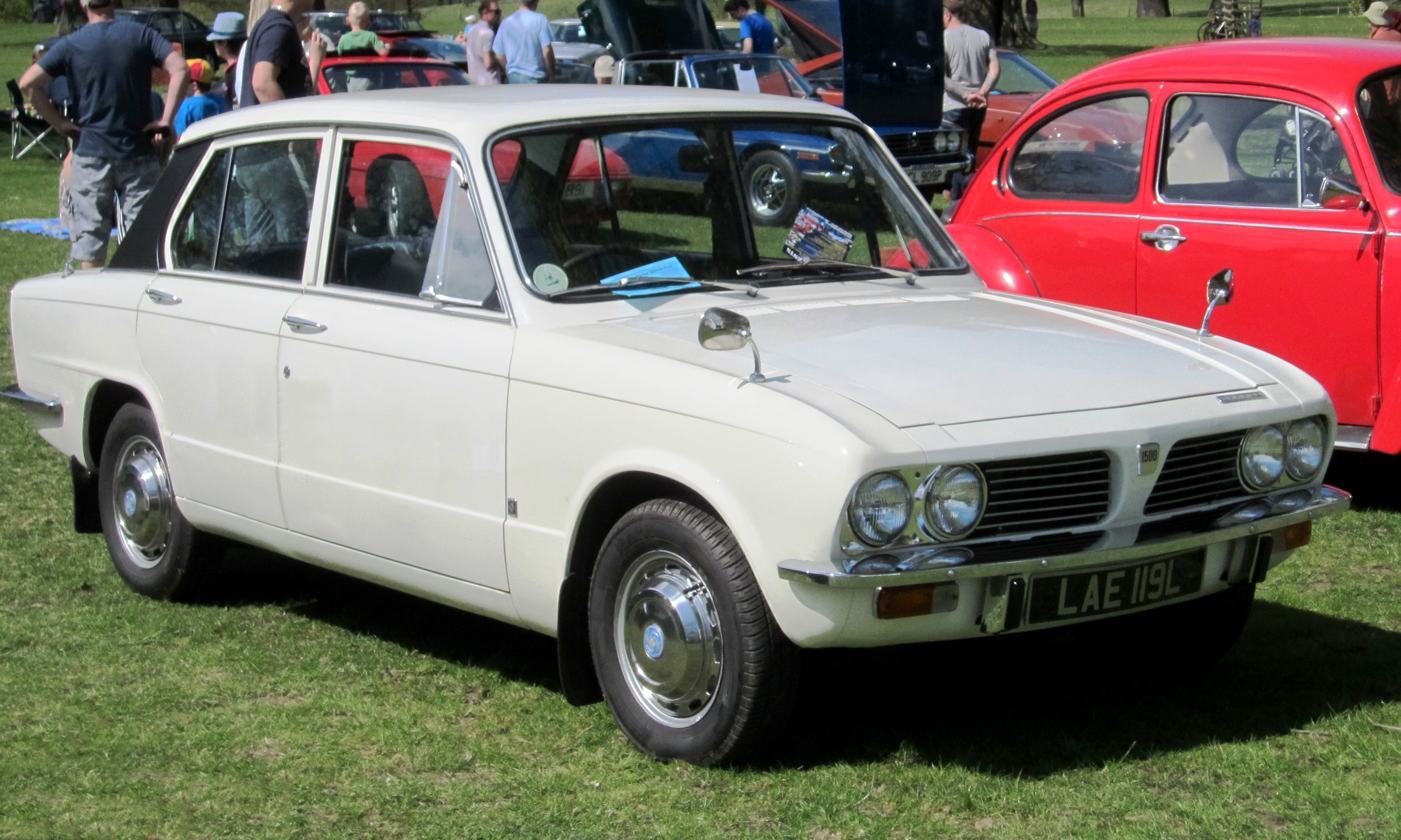
- Triumph 1500

Overview
- Manufacturer: Triumph (British Leyland)
- Production: 1500: 1970–1973; 66,353 built 1500TC: 1973–1976; 25,549 built
- Assembly: United Kingdom: Canley, Coventry
- Designer: Giovanni Michelotti

Body and chassis
- Body style: Four-door saloon

Powertrain
- Engine: 1,493 cc (91.1 cu in) OHV I4
- Transmission: 4-speed manual FWD on 1500; RWD on 1500TC

Dimensions
- Wheelbase: 97 in (2,464 mm)
- Length: 162 in (4,115 mm)
- Width: 62 in (1,575 mm)
- Height: 54 in (1,372 mm)
- Kerb weight: 2,093 lb (949 kg)

Chronology
- Predecessor: Triumph 1300
- Successor: Triumph Dolomite

The Triumph 1500 is a small front-wheel drive car that was produced by Triumph Motor Company division of British Leyland from 1970 to 1973. In 1973 it was revised as the Triumph 1500TC becoming rear-wheel drive. Production ended in 1976, by which time it had been replaced by the Triumph Dolomite.

== 1500 ==
Whilst retaining the front-wheel drive of the Triumph 1300, the body featured a restyled nose, a lengthened tail, twin headlights, horizontally mounted rear light clusters and a larger boot. The interior was also restyled featuring a new design of dashboard and door cards but retaining the wooden door cappings. The size of the Standard SC engine was increased to 1,493 cc (91.1 cu in) with a single SU carburettor and had a power output of 61 bhp (45 kW; 62 PS). The suspension used coil springs all round and was independent at the front, incorporating a dead-beam rear axle at the back, which represented something of a technological retreat from the all-independent suspension offered by the 1300. In 1972 the power output was increased to 65 bhp (48 kW; 66 PS) with an uprated carburettor and inlet manifold. These later cars also had a silver nose badge. Earlier cars had a black nose badge.

The car was capable of reaching a top speed of 87 mph (140 km/h) and could accelerate from 0–60 mph in 16.5 seconds.

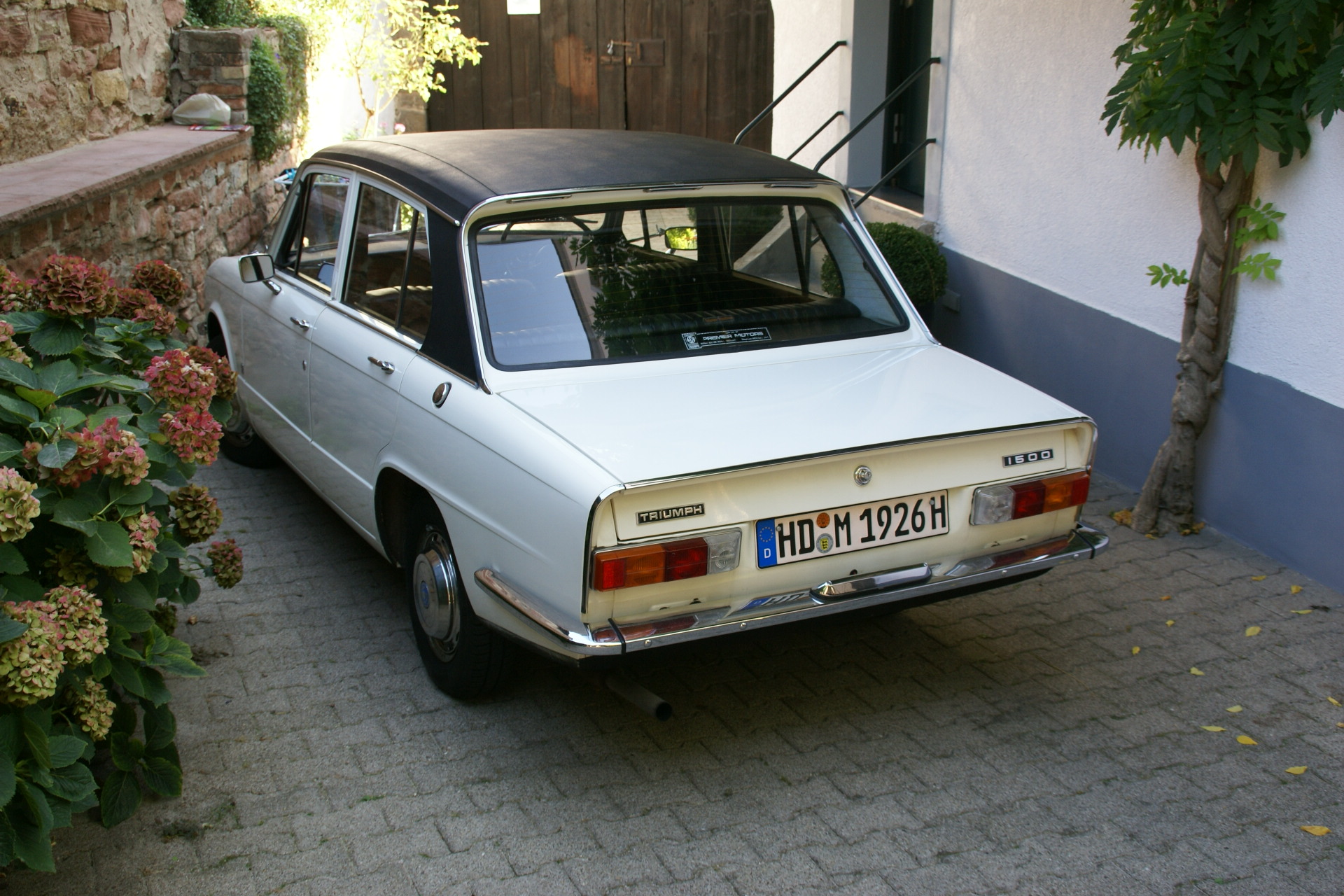
Triumph 1500

== 1500TC ==
In October 1973, the 1500 was renamed the 1500TC. It retained the same 1493 cc engine (now with twin SU carburettors) mated to the rear wheel drive drivetrain from the recently introduced Triumph Dolomite. The interior and exterior styling remained largely the same. The 1500TC can be identified by the "1500TC" bootlid badge and the black centres on the wheel trims, which were blue on the 1500.

The 1500TC was replaced by the Dolomite 1500/1500HL in March 1976.

The car was capable of reaching a top speed of 92 mph (148 km/h) and could accelerate from 0–60 mph in 14.0 seconds (0–100 km/h in 14.8 seconds).

A sunroof option was available.

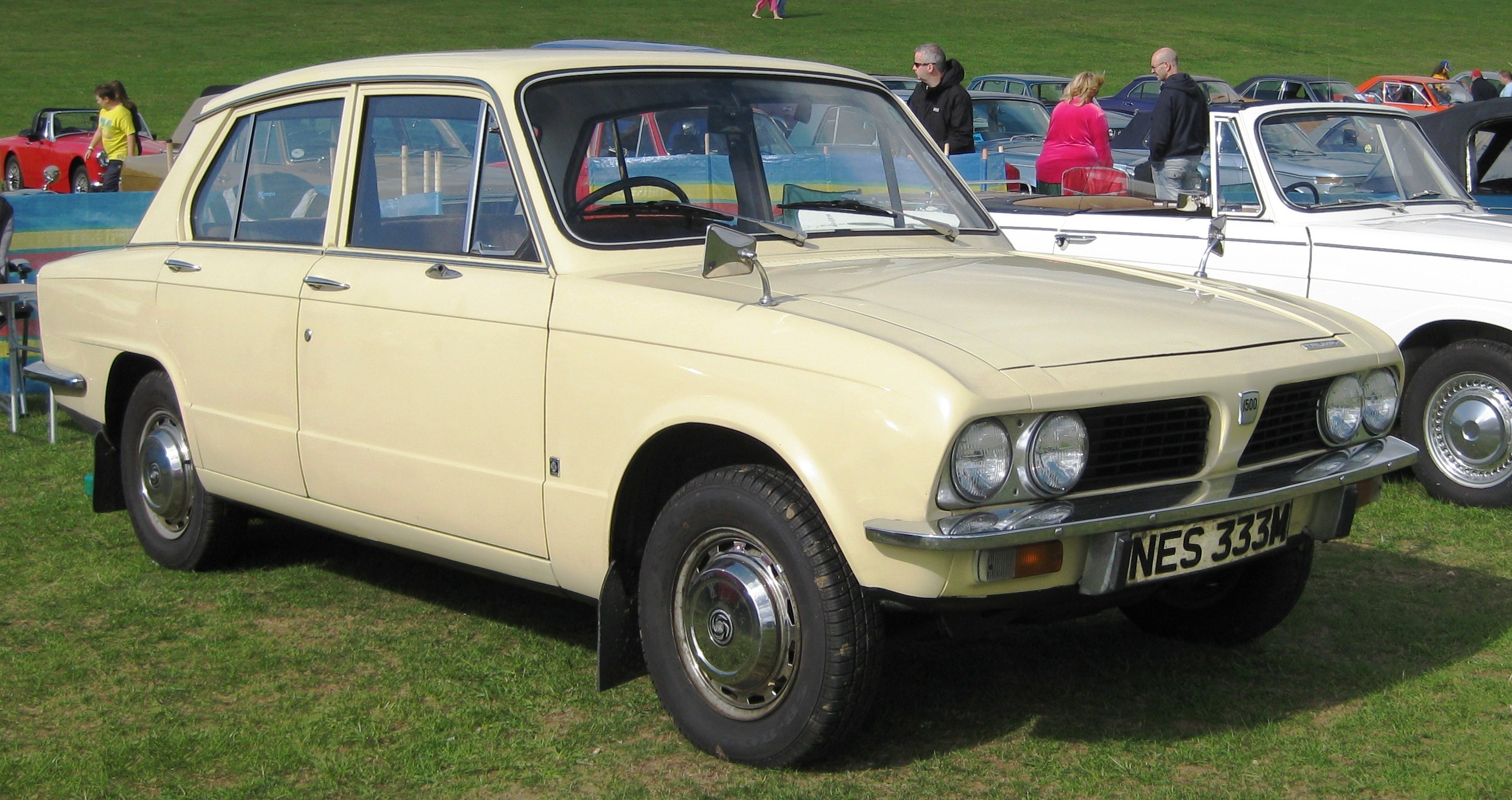
Triumph 1500TC (1973)

== Appendices ==
=== Publications ===
- Vale, Matthew (23 March 2015). Triumph Dolomite: An Enthusiast's guide. Marlborough: The Crowood Press. ISBN 978-1847978936. OCLC 920024430.
- Warrington, Kevin (15 September 2018). Triumph 1300 to Dolomite sprint. Amberley Publishing. ISBN 978-1445674605. OCLC 1020601314.

=== References ===
- Adams, Keith. "The Unofficial Austin Rover Web Resource". Archived from the original on 30 September 2010.

=== See also ===
- Adams, Keith (6 June 2018). "The cars : Triumph Dolomite (Ajax) development story". AROnline.com.
