= Saab Formula Junior =

Overview
- Manufacturer: Saab Automobile
- Production: 1960
- Designer: Rolf Mellde

Body and chassis
- Class: Open-wheel racing car
- Body style: Single-seat roadster
- Layout: FWD

Powertrain
- Engine: 950 cc Saab 2-stroke I3

Dimensions
- Curb weight: 380 kg (838 lb)

The Saab Formula Junior was a racing car built in 1960 by the Swedish car maker Saab. A total of two cars were built, with one surviving at the Saab Car Museum.

== History ==
In the autumn of 1960 Saab surprised the motor racing world when they entered racing in the Formula Junior class with two cars. At its core it was the fruition of the desire of the competition and test departments to experiment in practice with their performance ideas.

=== Development ===
In 1960 the Saab 93 was replaced with the Saab 96, with a larger 841 cc three cilinder Saab two-stroke engine. Before adding a 96-based performance successor of the GT750 with the larger engine, the competition and test departments wanted to try some new ideas. This coincided with the introduction in the late 1950s of a new international entry-level racing class as a nursery for racing drivers, the Formula Junior. Saab engineers wanted to use this as a testing ground, while management saw an opportunity for publicity.

A competitive entry would be required to have a high power-to-weight ratio, so it was calculated that with a minimum weight of 360 kg (790 lb) the engine would have to produce 90-100 bhp. (Note: The Formula Junior class used a scale for weight and engine displacement restrictions. Since Saab only had engines smaller than 1,000 cc (61 cu in) at its disposal, a minimum weight of 360 kg (790 lb) was applied.) To this end and to test whether a front-engined front-wheel-drive car would be able to handle this, the Saab Monster was created as testing bed. This was a stripped 93-body with two three cilinder Saab engines linked together in order to achieve the high power-to-weight ratio required for a Formula Junior car. After testing with the Monster and learning from its expected problems with understeer, the development of the Formula Junior car started.

=== Design and engine ===
The car shown at the Saab Car Museum next to the Saab Monster, used as proof of concept for racing with front-engined front-wheel-drive cars with a high power-to-weight ratio.

The body of the car was unusual and was designed under the direction of chief engineering, Rolf Mellde. Instead of using a multi-tubular spaceframe chassis like other Formula Junior cars, Saab chose to construct an advanced aluminium monocoque car, with a fibreglass nose-cone that covered the three cylinder Saab two stroke engine. In order to keep the nose flat, the engine was mounted horizontally on its side, in front of the front axle, with the gearbox behind it. This resulted in a 70-30 percent front-rear weight distribution. To address expected understeer, anti-roll bars were mounted to provoke the inner rear wheel to lift.

The original 841 cc (51.3 cu in) engine was 'bored-out' to 950 cc (58 cu in) to maximize performance within the class restrictions. The engine was fitted with a dual twin-choke Solex carburettor, with an additional 'half carburettor' to allow for a separate choke for each cilinder. The engine produced 95 bhp at 7,000 rpm. For cooling a cross-flow radiator without a fan but with an internal pump was mounted.

== Racing ==
The cars raced in the Swedish-colored livery of blue and yellow. The drivers were Erik Carlsson, Gösta Karlsson and Carl-Magnus Skogh. The cars first showed up at the Gelleråsen racetrack at Karlskoga in 1960 and then at the Eläintarhanajot race in Helsinki, Finland, in 1961, finishing 4th and 5th. The cars performed modestly in the races. They were fast in a straight line, but suffered from understeer due to the 70-30 weight distribution affecting cornering ability, despite the measures taken to reduce this. Nonetheless, two first places and a track record in Stockholm were achieved.

Erik Carlsson was recorded saying "you began to steer about 30-40 metres from the bend - and, even then, you weren't sure of getting around". The two cars were retired at the end of the 1961 racing season after changes to the competition rules for the following year would make it more difficult to keep the Saabs competitive. The lessons from the Formula Junior, especially regarding engine tuning, were taken to the rally programme, which became a key success for Saab in the following years.

== Quantum Formula S ==
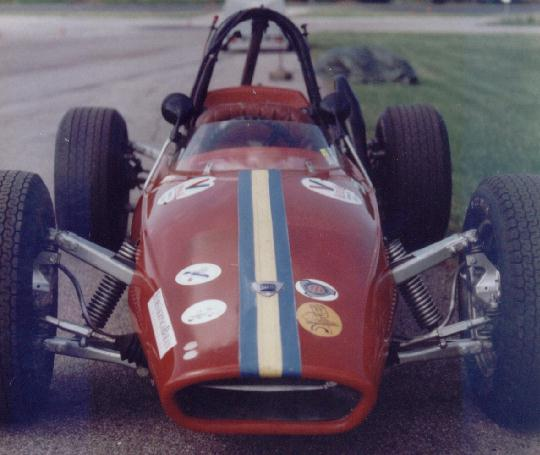
Saab Quantum IV 'Formula S'.

After Saab dropped Formula Junior racing in late 1961, an initiative was started to set up a similar Formula S class (Formula Saab) within the Sports Car Club of America (SCCA). An independent engineer in the United States privately developed small sports cars with Saab components under the name of Saab Quantum. His fourth iteration, the Saab Quantum IV from 1963, (Note: Sometimes named Saab Formula S or Saab Quantum Formula S.) was a kit car designed for the proposed Formula S class and drew on the Saab Formula Junior design. A few dozen were eventually sold, but the Formula S racing class never really materialized. Instead, the cars were raced in the Formula C.

== Sources ==
- Lindh, Bjorn-Eric (1987). SAAB, The First 40 Years of Saab Cars (1st ed.). Förlagshuset Noren AB. pp. 117–120. ISBN 91-86442-34-1.
- Chatterton, Mark (1980). SAAB, The Innovator (1st ed.). North Pomfret, Vermont: David & Charles. pp. 32–34. ISBN 0-7153-7945-3.
- Tunberg, Anders (1989). The cars in the Saab Museum (1st ed.). Saab-Scania AB. p. 17. ISBN 91-7970-561-8.
- Sjögren, Gunnar A. (1978). Saab, the first million (1st ed.). pp. 24–25, 27.
- "Saab Formula Junior". Saab Museum.
- "Saab Formula Junior". Formula Junior Racing Association.
