= Saab 60 =

Limited edition car made in the United Kingdom

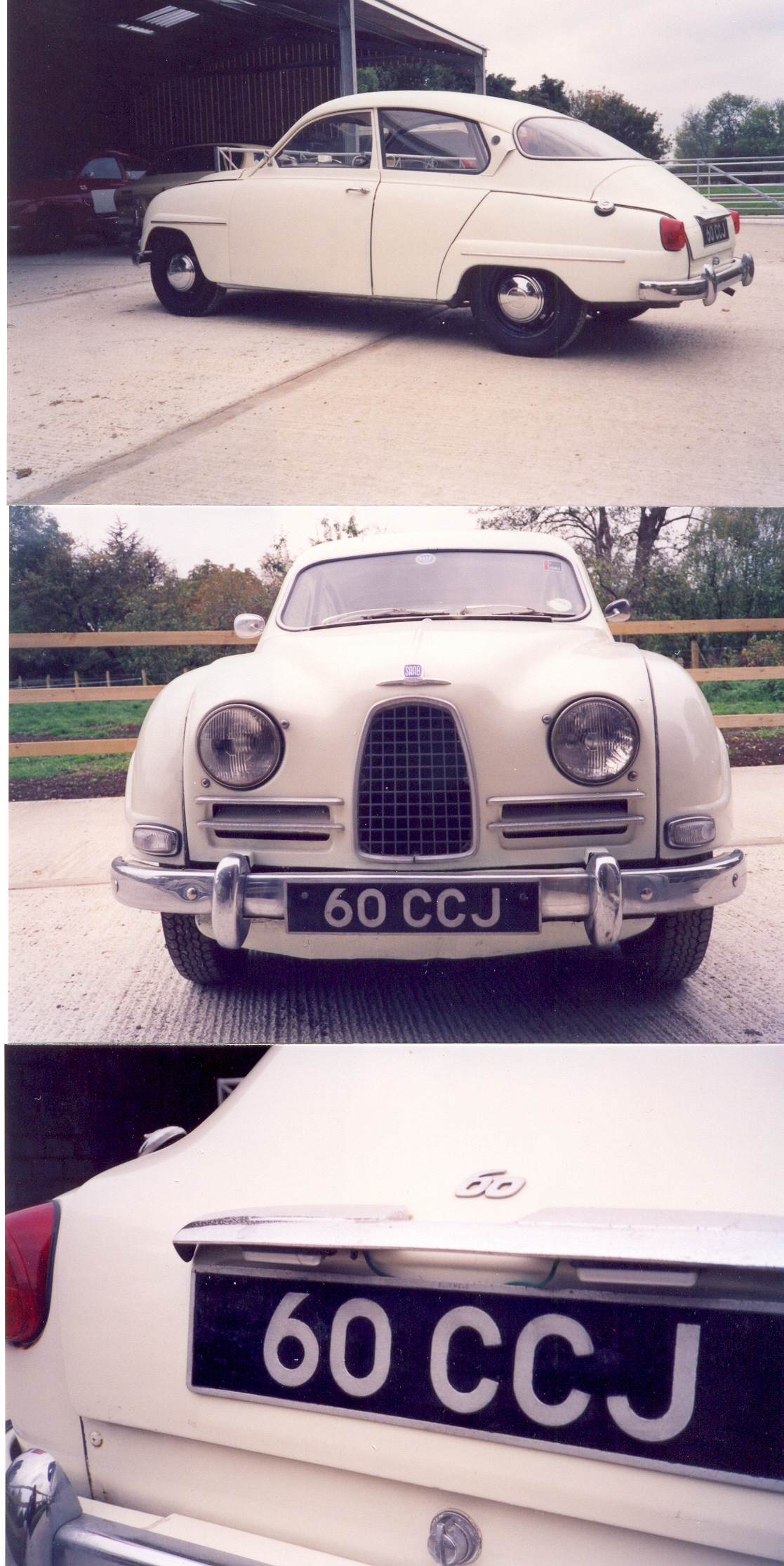
Saab 60

The Saab 60 was a 'special'. It was a limited edition modification of the 1962 Saab 96, peculiar to the UK. Modifications were carried out at Saab (GB) Ltd, in Slough.

In the early 1960s, Erik Carlsson and his Saab 96 two-stroke achieved a legendary series of victories in the RAC Rally and Monte Carlo Rally (among others). In honour of these successes "against the odds" and in view of the high demand in the UK for a 'sport' model (the Saab Sport), which was not yet available in right-hand drive form, the UK importers of Saab cars in Slough, England created a special series of approximately 56 modified Saab 96 cars, between June 1962 and April 1963. Thus was the Saab 60 born.

The standard 45 bhp (34 kW; 46 PS) was increased to 60 bhp (45 kW; 61 PS) by engine modification. The crankshaft was changed, the inlet ports were lowered and the exhaust ports raised. The carburettor and ignition settings were modified. A Saab Sport exhaust system was fitted. The suspension was lowered, by removing one 'turn' from each coil spring and Koni shock absorbers and Pirelli Cinturato radial-ply tyres were fitted. The three-speed gearbox was swapped for a four-speed box (but the original speedometer was left in situ, with its three-speed markings). A Smith's tachometer was also fitted. The engine modifications were executed by Mike Langton and the blocks were initialled and numbered by him. A Porsche "60" badge was requisitioned for the boot lid motif, in order to denote the car's special status and upgraded power output. An Oleopress fire extinguisher was fitted.

The only known survivor of this series is number 49; the engine being stamped 'ML49'. The registration plate, with which this car was purchased by the present owner, may or may not be the original registration but it is very apt.

The basic specification, apart from the above-listed items, was of a standard Saab 96.
