= Rock'n Solex =

French festival, in Rennes

Coordinates: 48°07′12″N 1°38′00″W

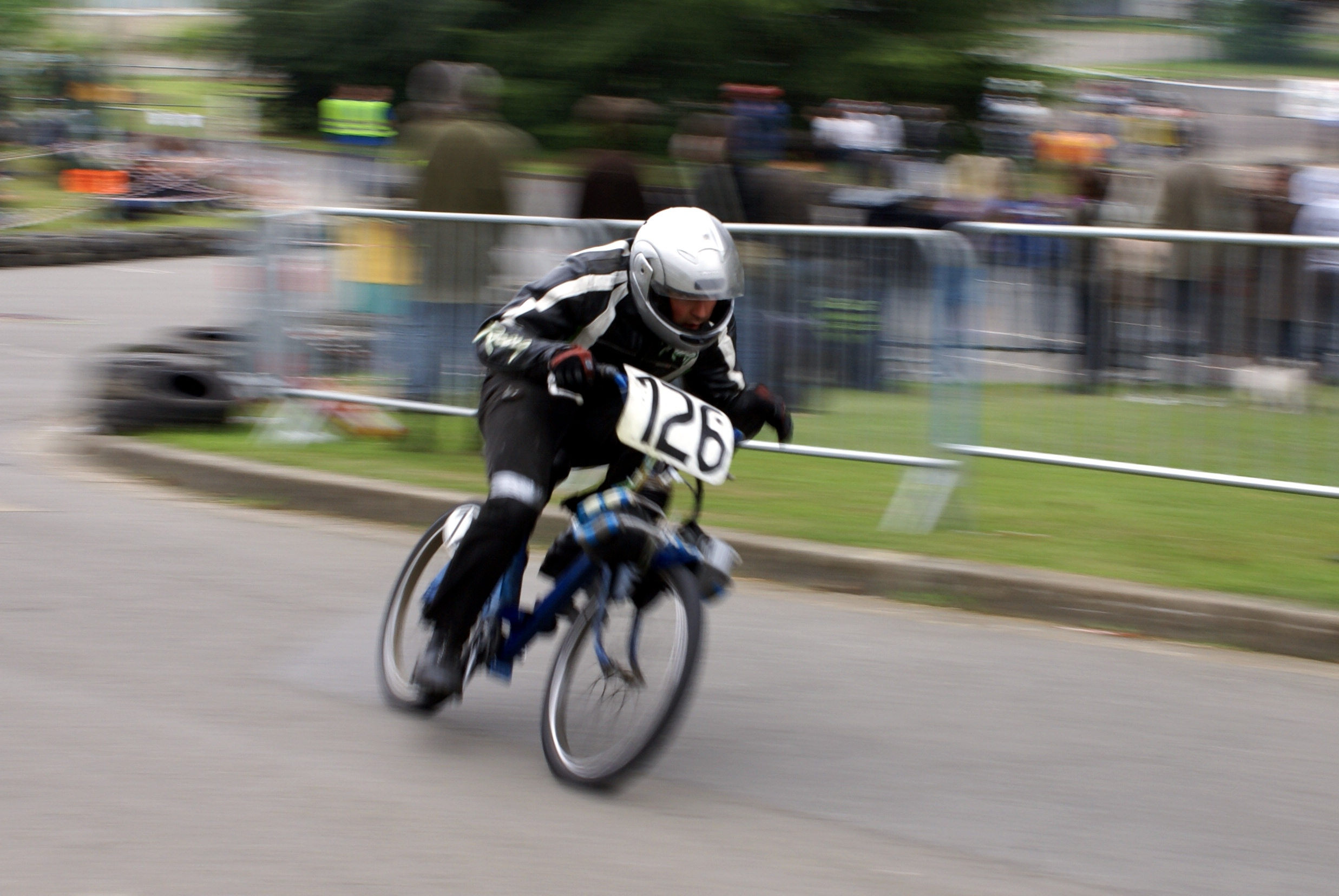
Speed race at Rock'n Solex

The Rock'n Solex festival is a French student festival, combining Solex racing and music, first held in 1967.

It combines Solex races during the day and music concerts every night.
