= Saab Quantum =

Series of concept cars

1963 Saab Quantum III

SAAB Quantum was a series of five privately designed and built automobiles using various Saab components. The earliest used Saab 93 two-stroke engines, transmissions and suspension. The later used Saab 96 drivetrains and suspension parts. All were built in the United States.

The Quantum I was built in 1959, with a chassis computer engineered by Walter Kern at IBM in his spare time. It wore only the most basic bodywork at first. After initial testing and a race or two, it was replaced with moderately more complete bodywork which it still wears to this day. The Quantum II was nearly identical in every way, though built later. Both Quantums I and II were raced in the SCCA H-Modified class. They were pure prototypes and racing cars, never intended for production.

The Quantum III was designed to be a production car and was first presented in 1962. Only a few copies were built. Due to a lack of quality it was turned down by Saab in Sweden and never went into production.

- Quantum I (1959) - 1st iteration was with a very basic aluminum body. Second iteration of the bodywork was only slightly more finished. This is the version it wears today.
- Quantum II - Nearly identical to the Quantum I in every way. Both use a water-cooled, three-cylinder Saab two-stroke engine.
- Quantum III - Completely new design. Built from Saab 96 drivetrains and has a 4-speed manual transmission. Three built.
- Quantum IV (1963) - Single seater formula car sold as a kit car. Intended for Sports Car Club of America's (SCCA) "Formula S" series.
- Quantum V (1965) - Ginetta body. Saab two-stroke engine and transmission. One built.
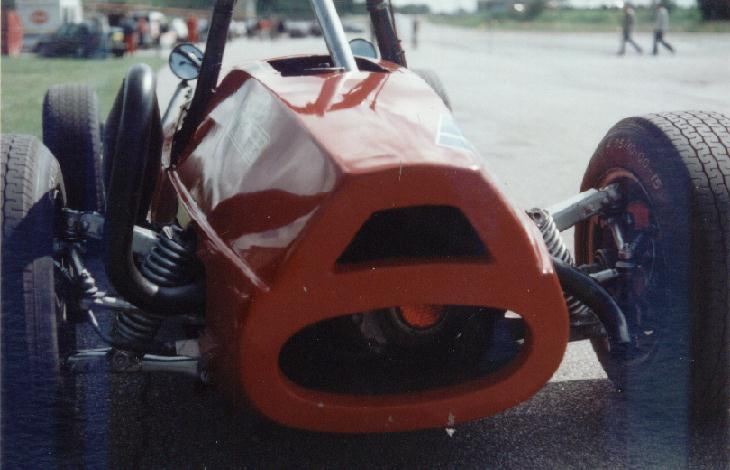
Saab Quantum IV rear

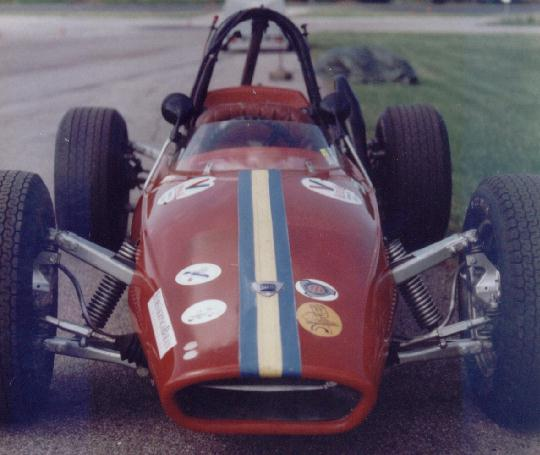
Saab Quantum IV front

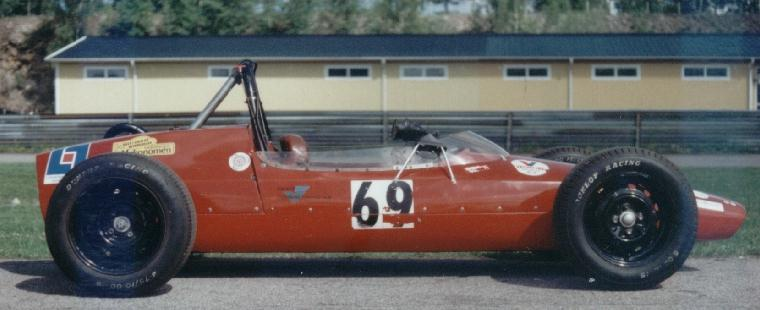
Saab Quantum IV side

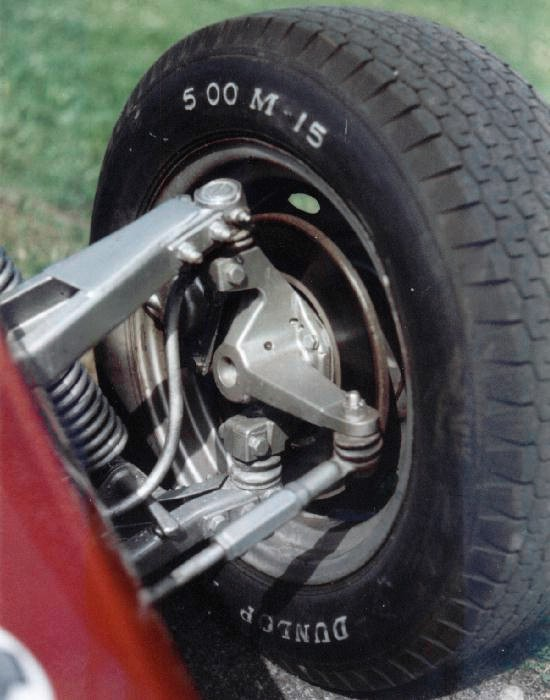
Saab Quantum IV double wishbone suspension (left front)
