= Saab Monster =

Experimental Swedish car

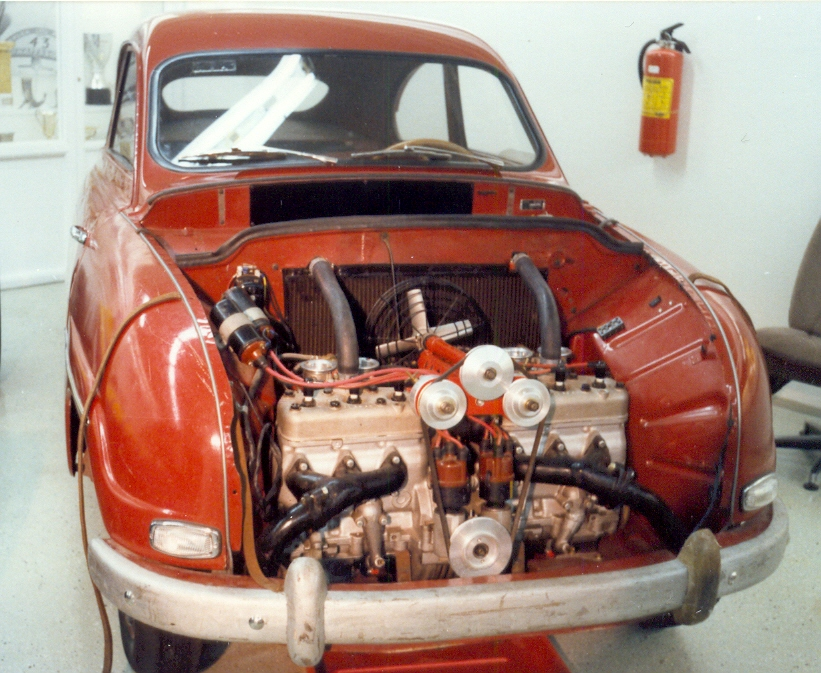
Saab 'Monster'

The Saab Monster was an experimental car made by Saab in 1959. This project was part of Saab's work in motorsport and the need to derive more power from their two-stroke powerplant.

== Design ==
The project consisted of a 'Toreador Red' Saab 93 with all excess weight removed, including the bonnet, which was replaced by a plastic one. The engineers then installed two transversely-mounted 748 cc (45.6 cu in) two-stroke, three cylinder engines, in a 'split in-line' configuration, driving the front wheels through a modified clutch and gearbox assembly. The drivetrain also used two distributors and an enlarged radiator.

This arrangement gave the car about 138 bhp (103 kW) and a top speed of 196 km/h (122 mph) (achieved at Såtenäs airfield). The low weight and the 'drop' or aerofoil shape of the body gave the rear end a tendency to become airborne when approaching the top speed. The amount of torque, coupled with front-wheel drive, also gave rise to severe understeer. It was the combination of immense power and poor handling that gave rise to the name 'Monster'.

== History ==
Started in 1959, this project was a part of Saab's work in motorsport and the need to derive more power from their then-standard two-stroke powerplant. During the project there was a speed record attempt but this was not recognised on account of discrepancies in scrutineering and recording. In the end, the project was terminated because it proved impractical.

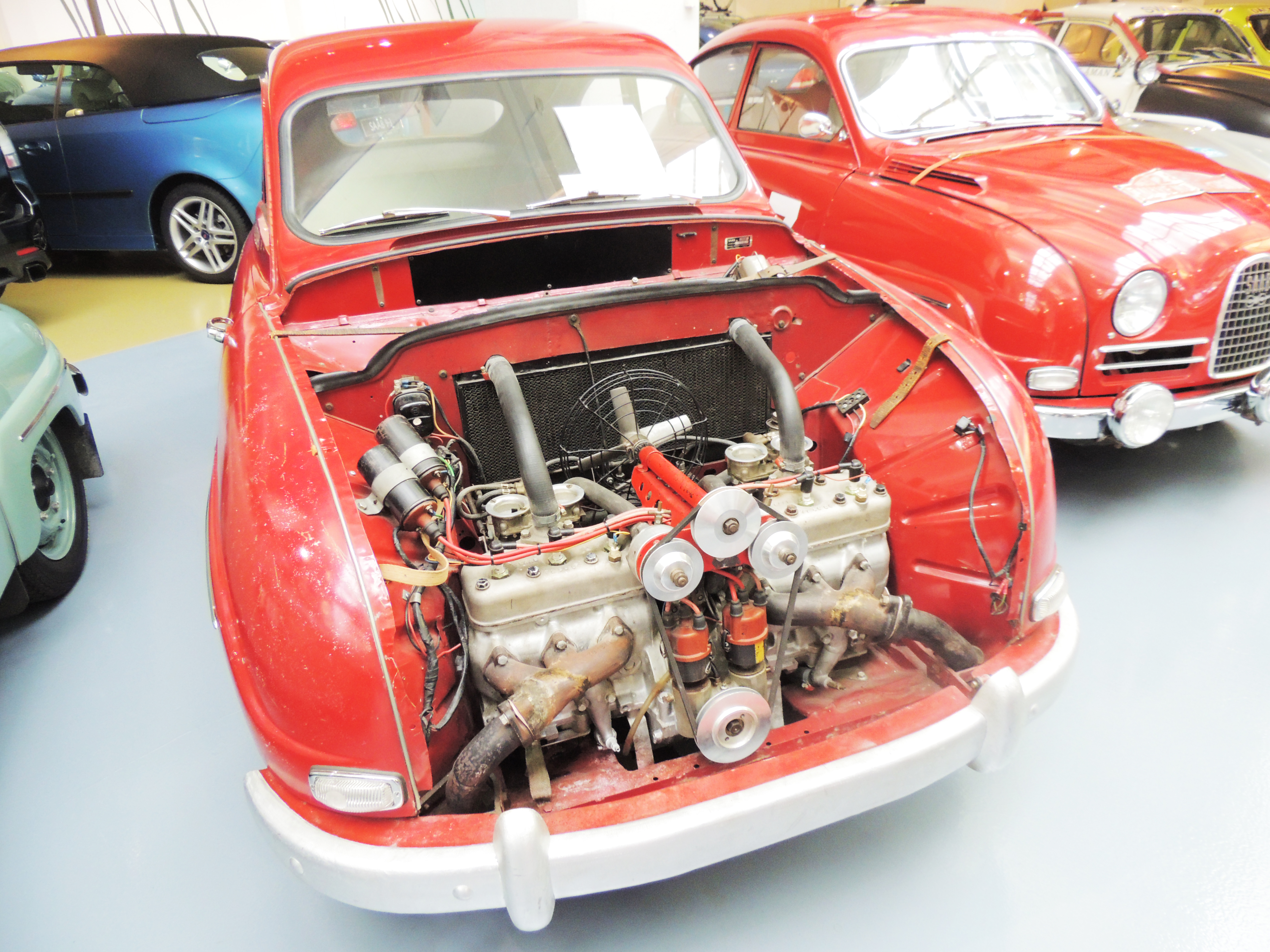
The restored 'Monster' at the Saab museum

The restored Saab Monster is now on display in the Saab museum in Trollhättan.

In the early 1970s Saab and Sportpromotion built a similar vehicle powered by two V4 engines giving 144 hp (107 kW).
