= Saab two-stroke =

Swedish automobile engine

The Saab two-stroke was a two-stroke cycle, inline, two cylinder, and later three cylinder engine manufactured by Swedish automotive manufacturer Saab that was based on a design by German manufacturer DKW.

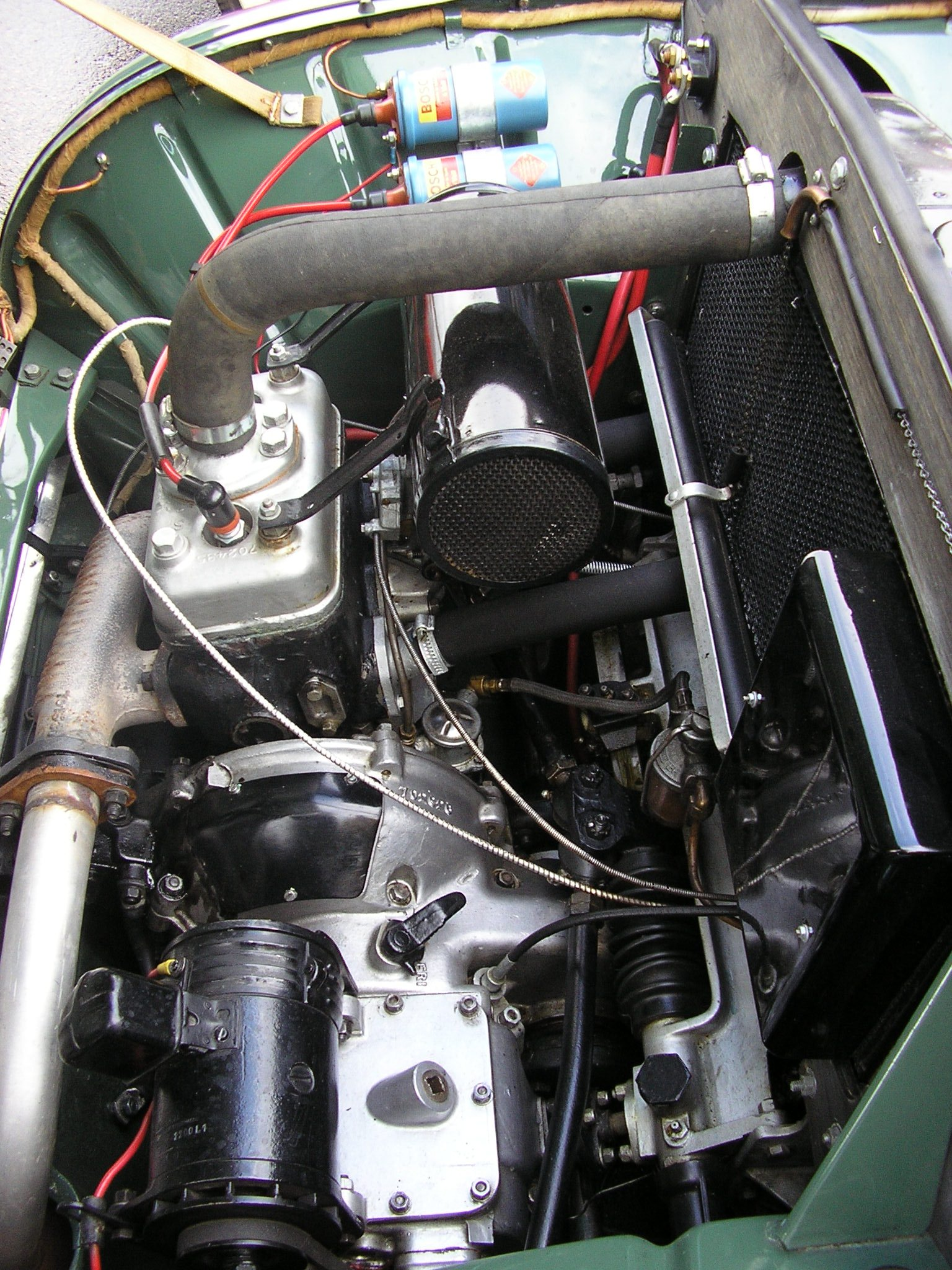
The two cylinder two-stroke engine in a Saab 92.

== Two-cylinder ==
The first version was a 764 cc (46.6 cu in) displacement straight-twin that was transversely mounted in the 1950–1956 Saab 92. It produced 25 hp (19 kW) and the car had a top speed of 100 km/h (62 mph). For the 1954 model year the engine received a Solex 32BI carburetor and an improved ignition coil, which raised engine output to 28 hp (21 kW). It had some modern features not found in other cars of its time period, such as one ignition coil per cylinder.

== Three-cylinder ==
- DKW 3-cylinder 2-stroke liquid-cooled engine

The second type of Saab two stroke engine was a longitudinally placed inline-three cylinder of 748 cc (45.6 cu in) and initially 33 hp (25 kW). It was used in the Saabs 93, 94 (Sonett I, with an engine tuned to 57.5 hp (42.9 kW)), Saab Sonett II, 95, 96, Saab Granturismo, the Saab Formula Junior and the Saab Quantum. The engine had a combined belt driven DC dynamo and a coolant water pump.

The Saab Formula Junior used a 'bored-out' horizontally mounted 950 cc (58 cu in) version which utilized two dual Solex carburettors developing some 95 hp (71 kW). One of these carburettors was divided in half, thus providing three chokes, one for each cylinder.

The 841 cc (51.3 cu in) engine used in the 1966 Saab 96 used pre-mix oil and appeared with a three-throat Solex carburetor in which the center carburetor handled start, idle, and low speed functions, increasing the power to 42 hp (31 kW). The same carburetor had been used in the Saab 96 Monte Carlo and Sport models. The use of a common throttle shaft minimized carburetor synchronization problems.

The 1958-59 Sports version of the 93B had 48–50 hp (36–37 kW) in base version and 57 hp (43 kW) in the super version. This model had triple carburetors and a motor oil injection system, rather than oil pre-mixed with the petrol.

From 1959 the displacement was raised to 841 cc (51.3 cu in) with 38 hp (28 kW). For model year 1966, the 'standard' 3-cylinder two-stroke engine had three individual carburetors. From model year 1967 Saab began replacing their 3-cylinder with the Ford Taunus V4 engine.

A special version known as the 'Shrike' was built for the United States 1967 and 1968 model years. It was sleeved down to 795 cc (48.5 cu in) to avoid US emission regulations which exempted engines under 50 cu in (819 cc).

Saab also made some experimental V6 engines by mounting two three-cylinder two-stroke engines together at an angle. One of these experiments had carburetors mounted outside of the V, while another had a more conventional design with a carburetor in between the two blocks.

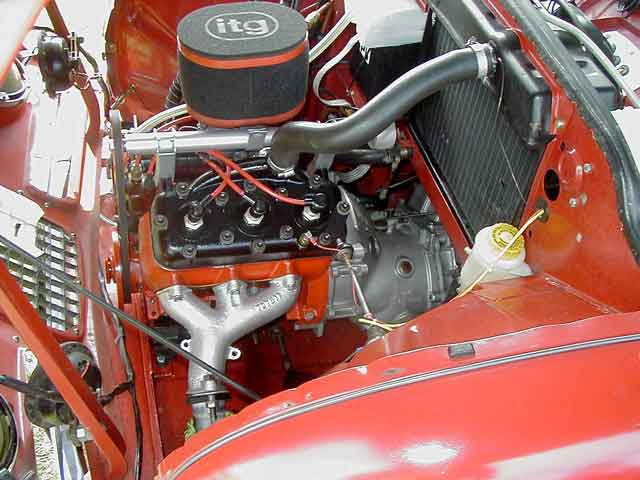
Three cylinder two-stroke engine

== Production ==
Initially all two-stroke engines were built at the Saab Trollhättan plant, however in 1953 engines and gearbox production was moved to an old washing machine factory in Gothenburg.

When Saab discontinued production of the two stroke engine and replaced it with a four stroke V4 engine built by Ford in Germany, the plant in Gothenburg never again produced engines; the production capacity was needed for the increased demand of gearboxes due to the introduction of the Saab 99 a few years later.

== Applications ==
=== Two-cylinder ===
- Saab 92

=== Three-cylinder ===
- Saab 93
- Saab 94 Sonett I
- Saab 95
- Saab 96
- Saab Formula Junior
- Saab GT750
- Saab Quantum
- Saab Sonett II
- Saab Monster
  - used twin 748 cc (45.6 cu in) two-stroke three-cylinder engines

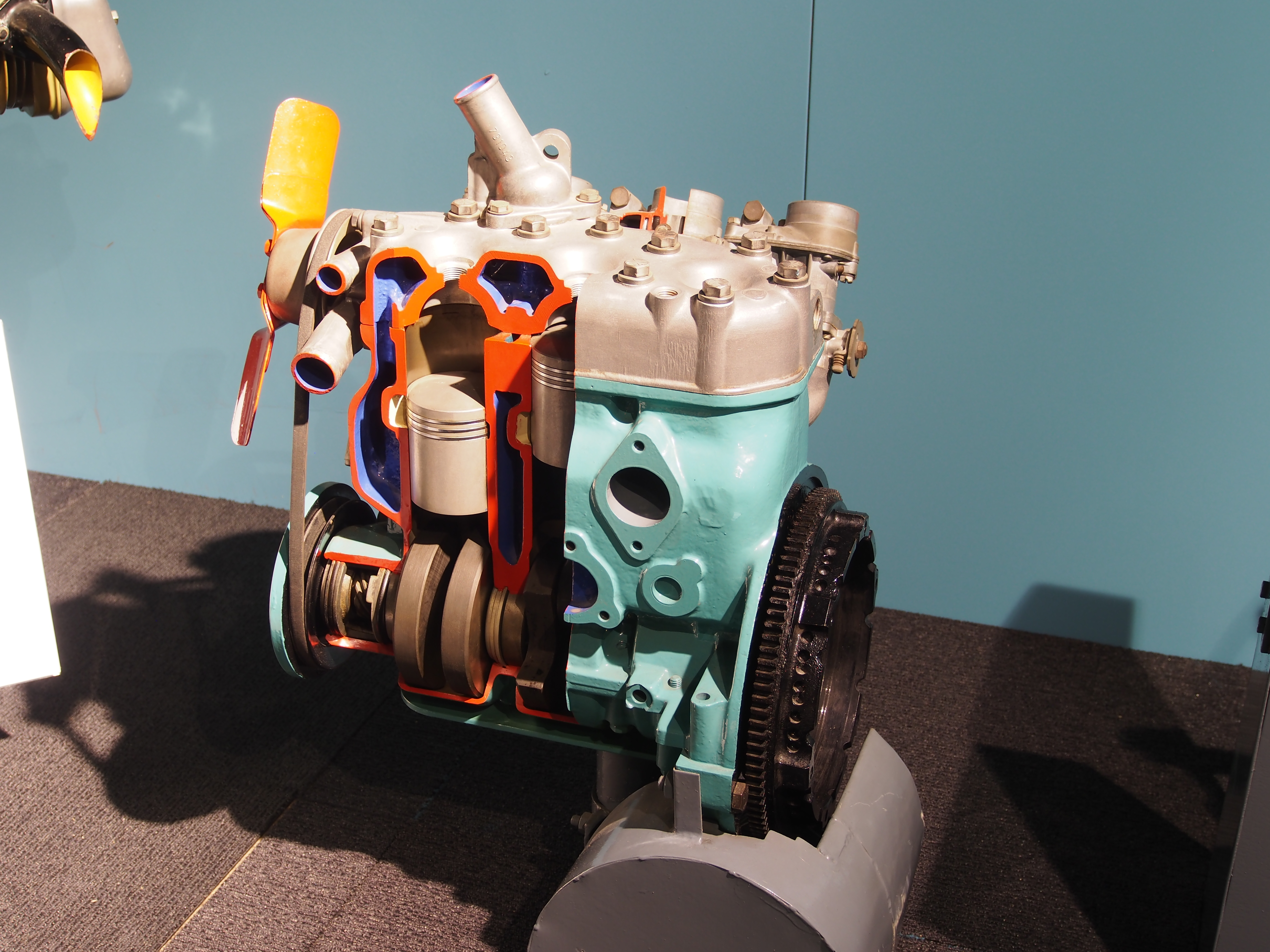
A cutaway version of the 841cc three-cylinder two-stroke engine

== See also ==
- Ford Taunus V4
  - the engine which replaced the Saab two-stroke
- Saab B engine
- Saab H engine
