= Great American Mountain Rally =

Great American Mountain Rally (GAMR) was an automotive rally held in November in New England, United States. The course was 1500 miles long in harsh temperatures and cruel terrain. GAMR was possibly the first-ever US FIA-sanctioned rally.

In 1957, Saab 93 cars made headline news as three stock 93s entered into the competition and won first, third and fourth place in their class, as well as overall and team trophies.

== Winners ==
=== 1953 ===
- Manufacturer's team prize - Sunbeam

=== 1954 ===
- Manufacturer's team prize - Sunbeam

Sheila van Damm traveled from England to compete.

=== 1955 ===
November 24–26 1 Kriplen-Richert (Porsche) 2 Blodgett-Rauch (Triumph TR2) 3 Bulck, W.-Bulck, E. (Austin-Healey)

=== 1956 ===
November 21-25 1 Lehmann-Brown (Saab) 2 Mackley-Hamlock (Renault) 3 Blackburn, D. and F. (Jaguar) 4 Young-Fendler (Volkswagen) 5 Hurtley, H. and A. (Triumph TR3) 6 Middle-Muskin (Saab) 7 Gatsonides-Blodgett (Triumph TR3)

=== 1957 ===
There has been no evidence discovered that the event ran through 1957; 1956 was the last year based upon all the documentation I have found. 1956 was the year that SAAB first came over and essentially swept the field.

- Winner Bob Wehman and Louis Braun, USA - Saab 93
- Manufacturer's team prize - SAAB
