= Formula Junior =

1958–1963 single-seater racing category

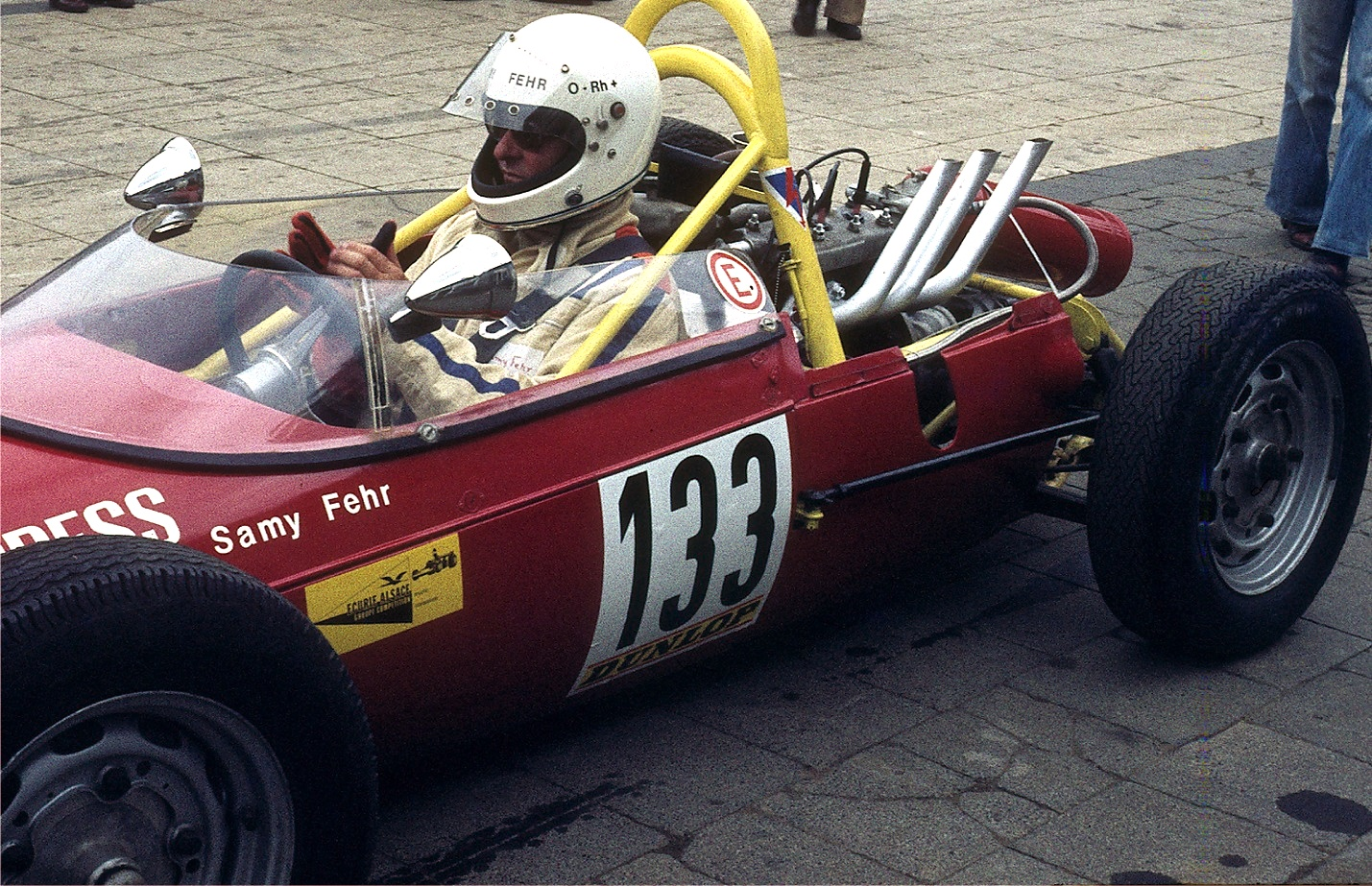
- A Formula Junior car powered by a DKW engine
- Category: Single-seater
- Country: International
- Region: Europe, North America, Australasia
- Inaugural season: 1958
- Folded: 1963
- Constructors: Italy: Stanguellini, Taraschi, Osca, Dagrada; UK: Lotus, Cooper, Brabham, Lola, Elva; Others: Melkus (GDR), De Sanctis, Gemini, Elfin (AUS)
- Engine suppliers: Fiat 1100/1200, Lancia, Ford Kent 105E, BMC A-Series, DKW, Saab
- Tyre suppliers: Dunlop, Continental

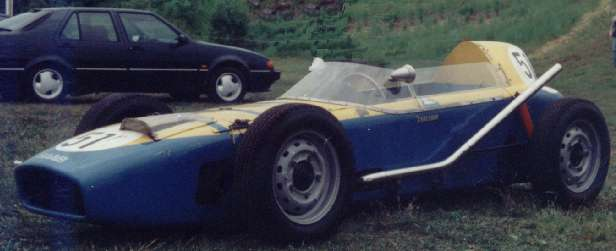
A front-engined Saab Formula Junior with a distinct aerodynamic nose.

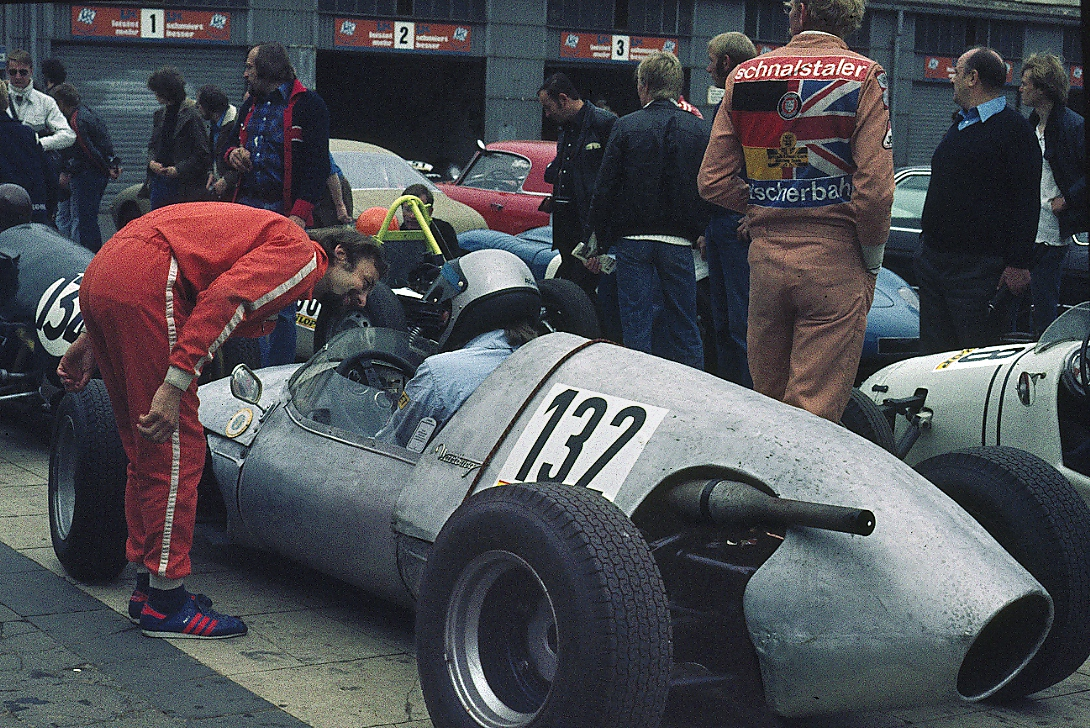
Melkus Formula Junior from East Germany (GDR).

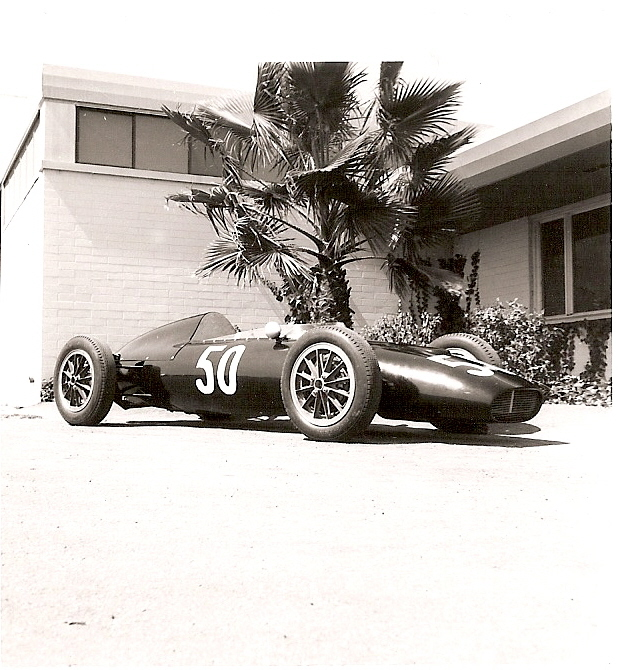
John Crosthwaite-designed Dolphin Formula Junior with 997 cc (60.8 cu in) Anglia engine.

Formula Junior (FJ) is an historic open-wheel racing category which served as an international entry-level class between 1958 and 1963. The formula was conceived by Italian Count Giovanni Lurani to provide an affordable entry point for young drivers into single-seater racing, utilizing mechanical components derived from volume-production road cars.

It effectively bridged the gap between karting and Formula One, serving as a crucial talent incubator for future World Champions including Jim Clark, John Surtees, Denny Hulme, and Jochen Rindt. Rather than entirely replacing the existing 500cc Formula 3 class (which utilized motorcycle engines), Formula Junior co-existed with it for several years before the FIA restructured the junior single-seater ladder in 1964. During its six-year lifespan, Formula Junior facilitated the rapid transition of race car design from traditional front-engined spaceframes to rear-engined monocoque and spaceframe hybrids.

The category was discontinued at the end of the 1963 season, with the governing body, the FIA, replacing it with revived Formula Two and Formula Three categories for 1964. Today, Formula Junior remains one of the most popular categories in historic motorsport, governed by the FIA Lurani Trophy.

== Regulations ==
The rules for Formula Junior were adopted by the CSI (International Sporting Commission, the predecessor to the FIA's sporting commission) in October 1958. They were outlined in the FIA's Appendix C (and later Appendix K for historic racing) and were explicitly designed to ensure cars were relatively inexpensive to build and maintain by mandating production-based components. Key technical regulations included:

- Engine: The engine block, cylinder head, and cylinders had to come from a production car homologated by the FIA as a touring car.
- Displacement and Weight: A sliding scale was used to balance performance between different engine sizes:
  - 1,100 cubic centimetres (67 cu in) maximum capacity with a minimum weight of 400 kilograms (880 lb).
  - 1,000 cubic centimetres (61 cu in) maximum capacity with a minimum weight of 360 kilograms (790 lb).
- Modifications: While the block and head had to remain stock, internal tuning (such as high-compression pistons and balanced rotating assemblies) was permitted. However, overhead camshafts were forbidden unless the original production engine was so equipped.
- Components: Gearboxes and braking systems (initially drums, later discs) also had to be sourced from production automobiles.
- Dimensions: Minimum wheelbase of 200 centimetres (79 in) and minimum track of 110 centimetres (43 in).

== History ==
=== Origins and Italian dominance (1958–1959) ===
Count Giovanni Lurani recognized that Italy lacked a training class for drivers to replace the aging pre-war generation. With the 500cc motorcycle-engined Formula 3 proving too specialized and fragile for widespread amateur use, Lurani proposed a "Formula Junior" based on the readily available and robust Fiat 1100 engine.

The inaugural international race took place at the Autodromo Nazionale Monza on 25 April 1958. It was won by Roberto Lippi in a Stanguellini. Early grids were dominated by Italian constructors such as Stanguellini, Taraschi, Osca, and Dagrada. These cars followed traditional design philosophies: front-mounted engines, tubular spaceframe chassis, and components primarily from the Fiat 1100 or Lancia Appia.

=== British expansion and rear-engine revolution (1960–1963) ===
As the formula spread internationally, British constructors entered the market and fundamentally changed the sport. While early British efforts like the Elva 100 and Gemini Mk2, as well as the Swedish Saab Formula Junior, retained the front-engine layout, the introduction of the Cooper T52 and the Lotus 18 in 1960 revolutionized the class.

These British cars placed the engine behind the driver, offering superior aerodynamics, a lower frontal area, and better weight distribution. Concurrently, engine tuning specialists such as Cosworth and Holbay began developing the 997 cc (60.8 cu in) Ford 105E (from the Ford Anglia) and the BMC A-Series engine. These engines proved more tunable and capable of higher RPMs than the heavier Fiat and Lancia units.

By 1961, the rear-engined layout was standard. Lotus (with the 20, 22, and 27 models), Cooper, Brabham (BT2, BT6), and Lola dominated the grids. The intense competition turned Formula Junior into a "mini-Formula 1," with professional teams and increasing costs. The introduction of the aluminum monocoque chassis with the Lotus 27 in 1963 marked the pinnacle of the category's technological escalation, pushing it far beyond Lurani's original "low-cost" mandate.

=== Global reach ===
Formula Junior achieved immense success outside of Europe. In the United States, the Sports Car Club of America (SCCA) organized a fiercely contested National Championship series, producing notable American champions and attracting top European drivers to North American circuits like Lime Rock Park and Laguna Seca. In Australia, the category was integrated into the prestigious Australian Gold Star championship, and local constructors like Elfin Sports Cars began building highly competitive machines tailored to local conditions.

=== Demise ===
The escalation in costs and technology defeated the original purpose of the formula. In 1964, the FIA abolished Formula Junior. It was replaced by a two-tier structure:

- Formula Two: 1,000 cc free-formula engines for professional drivers.
- Formula Three: 1,000 cc production-based engines (with a single carburetor restrictor) for developing talent, effectively returning to the cost-control philosophy Lurani had originally envisioned.

== Champions ==
Formula Junior did not have a single unified FIA World Championship. Instead, various prestigious national championships and international series were held globally.

=== Period champions (1958–1963) ===
Year	Series	Champion	Car / Engine	Reference
1959	Italian / European FJ Championship	(Switzerland) Michael May	Stanguellini-Fiat	
1960	European FJ Championship	(United Kingdom) Colin Davis	Osca-Fiat	
1961	European FJ Championship	(Switzerland) Jo Siffert	Lotus-Ford	
1960	(United Kingdom) British (John Davy Trophy)	(United Kingdom) Jim Clark	Lotus 18-Ford	
1961	(United Kingdom) British (Motor Racing)	(United Kingdom) Bill Moss	Gemini-Ford	
1962	(United Kingdom) British Championship	(United Kingdom) Peter Arundell	Lotus 22-Ford	
1961	(United States) SCCA National	(United States) Harry Carter	Lotus 18-Ford	
1962	(United States) SCCA National	(United States) Timmy Mayer	Cooper T59-Ford	
1963	(United States) SCCA National	(United States) Gaston Andrey	Lotus 22-Ford	
1962	(Australia) Australian Formula Junior Championship	(Australia) Frank Matich	Elfin-Ford	
1963	(Australia) Australian Formula Junior Championship	(Australia) Leo Geoghegan	Lotus 22-Ford	

=== Historic Lurani Trophy ===
The FIA Lurani Trophy is the current FIA-sanctioned European historic championship for Formula Junior cars, contested under period-accurate Appendix J regulations.

Year	Champion	Car	Reference
1997–1998	(United Kingdom) Tony Thompson	Lotus 27	
2003	(Denmark) Erik Justesen	U2 Mk2	
2010	(United States) John Delane	Lotus 18	
2015	(Switzerland) Bruno Weibel	Lotus 20	
2022	(Denmark) Erik Justesen	U2 Mk2	
2024	(United Kingdom) Clive Richards	Lotus 22	

== See also ==
- Formula One
- Formula Three
- Messina Grand Prix
- Australian Formula Junior Championship
