= Saab 96 =

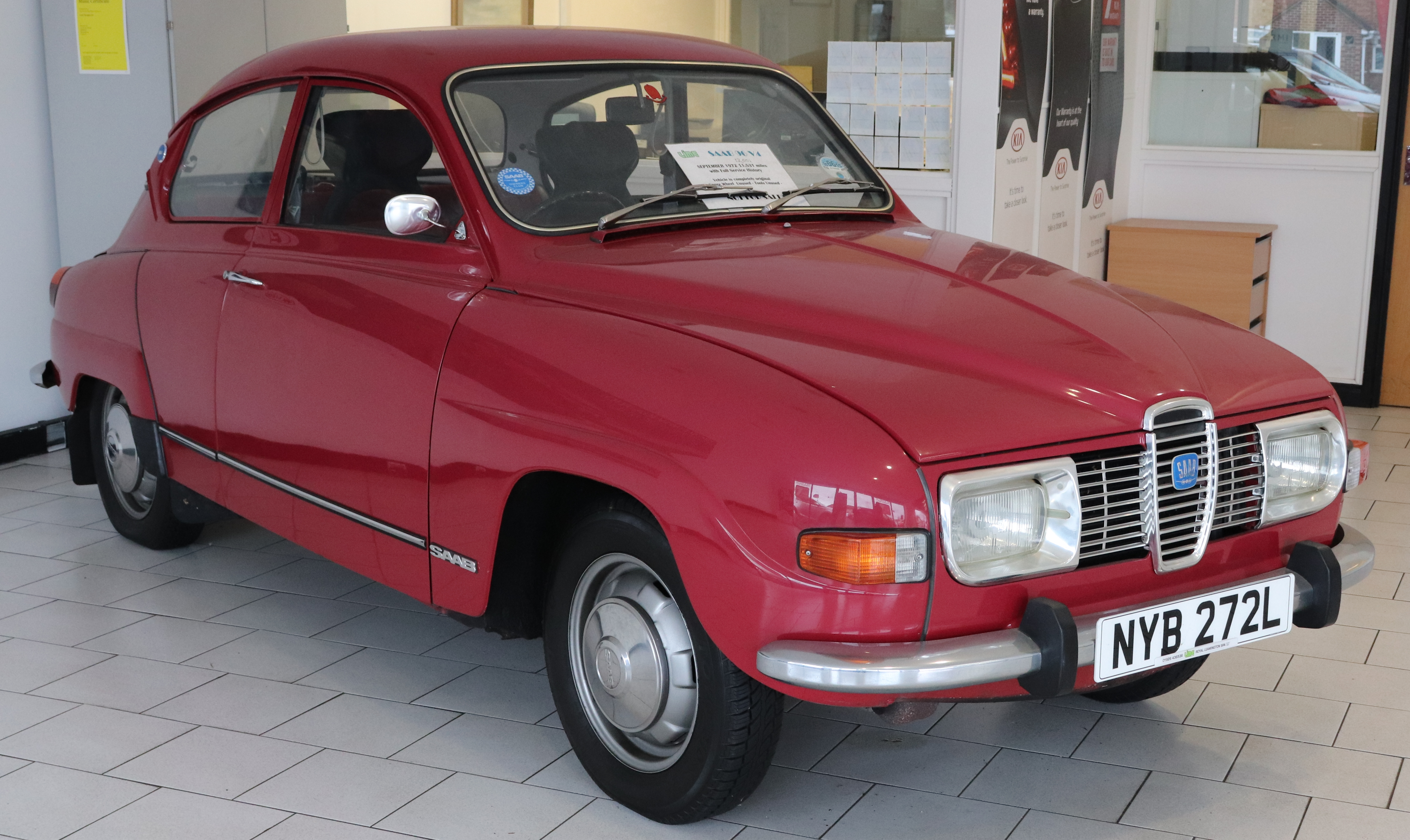
- 1972 Saab 96 V4

Overview
- Manufacturer: Saab Automobile
- Production: 1960–1980
- Assembly: Sweden: Trollhättan (Trollhättan Assembly); Finland: Uusikaupunki (Saab-Valmet); Belgium: Antwerp
- Designer: Sixten Sason

Body and chassis
- Class: Compact
- Body style: 2-door sedan
- Layout: Longitudinal front-engine, front-wheel drive
- Related: Saab 95; Saab Granturismo

Powertrain
- Engine: 795 cc Saab 2-stroke I3 (US, 1968); 841 cc Saab 2-stroke I3; 1,498 cc Taunus V4; 1,698 cc Taunus V4
- Transmission: 3-speed manual; 4-speed manual; 3-speed Saxomat

Dimensions
- Wheelbase: 2,488 mm (98.0 in)
- Length: 4,050 mm (159.4 in)
- Width: 1,570 mm (61.8 in)
- Height: 1,473 mm (58.0 in)
- Kerb weight: 873–950 kg (1,925–2,094 lb)

Chronology
- Predecessor: Saab 93
- Successor: Saab 99

The Saab 96 is an automobile manufactured and marketed by Swedish automaker Saab from 1960 to January 1980, replacing the Saab 93. The 96 featured aerodynamic two-door bodywork, four-passenger seating and at first a two-stroke, three-cylinder engine, later a four-stroke V4.

== Body design ==
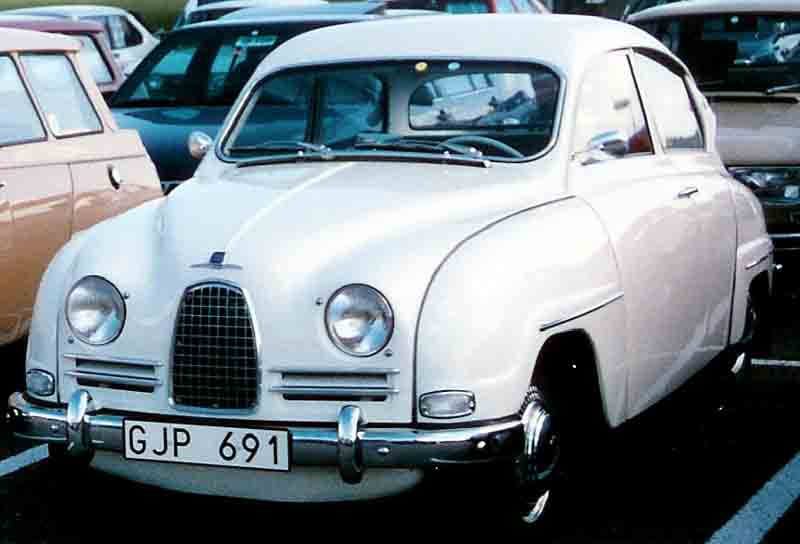
1961 Saab 96 De Luxe

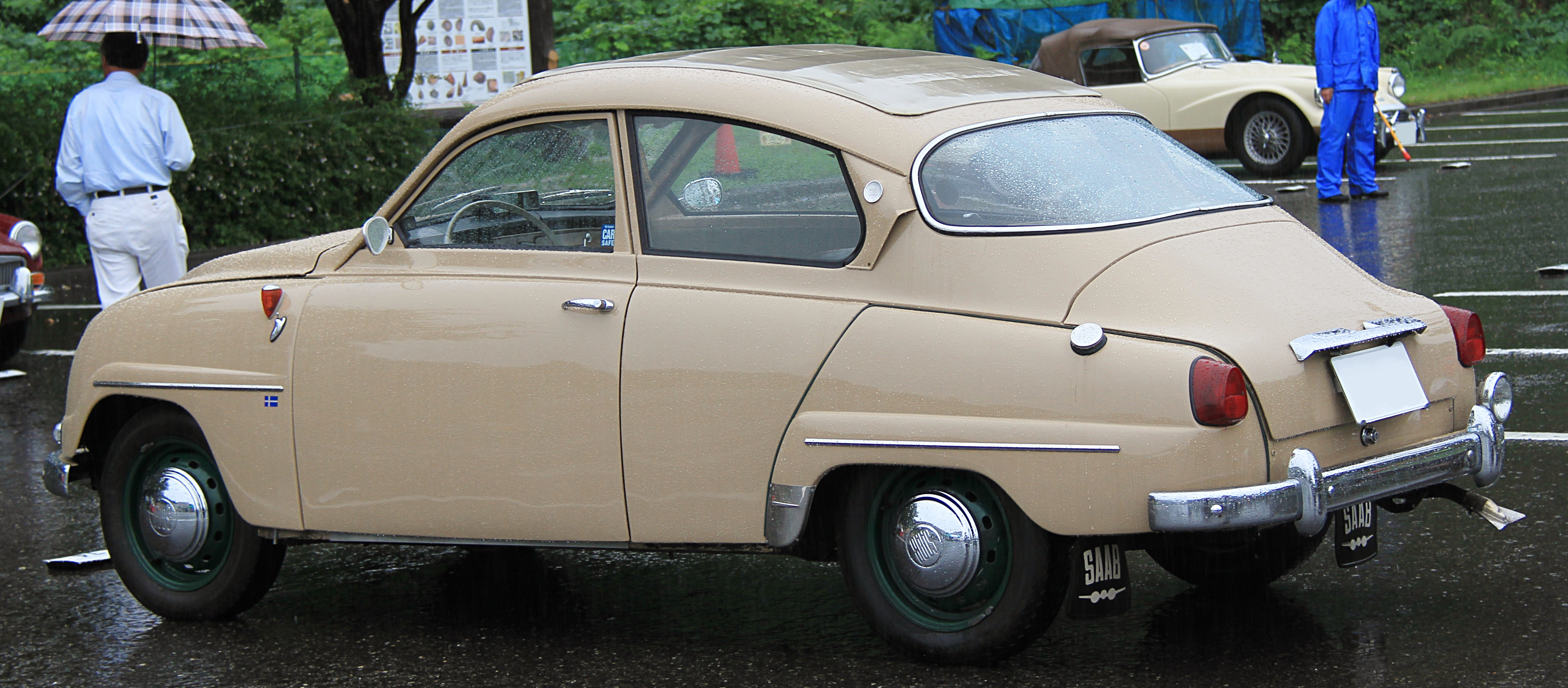
Rear view of a 1961 Saab 96 with sunroof

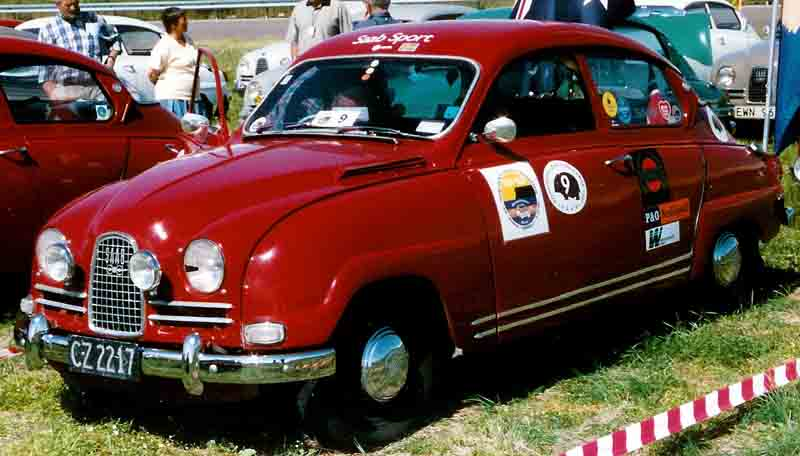
Saab Sport, a modified version of the Saab 96

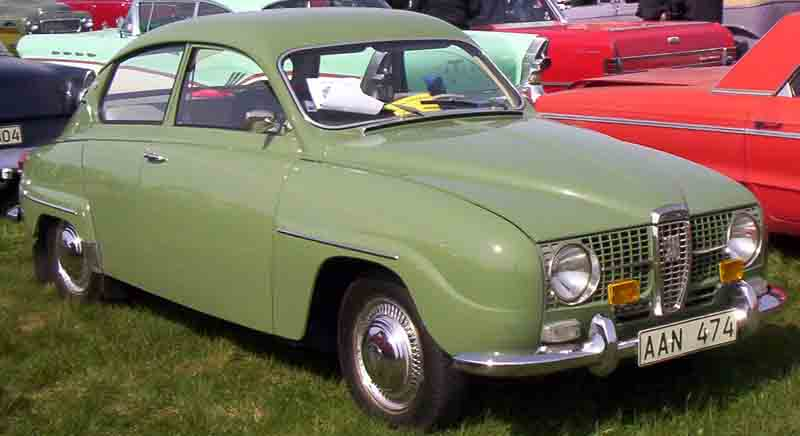
1965 Saab 96 with the extended nose that accommodated the radiator being moved forward of the engine

Compared with its predecessor, the Saab 93, the 96 featured greater and more easily accessible storage space and a larger rear window. The front end was lengthened for 1965 models, in preparation for a new engine, and the radiator was placed ahead of the engine, rather than above and behind, a leftover from when earlier models had thermosiphon cooling. Both front and rear windows were enlarged slightly for 1968 models.

== Engine ==
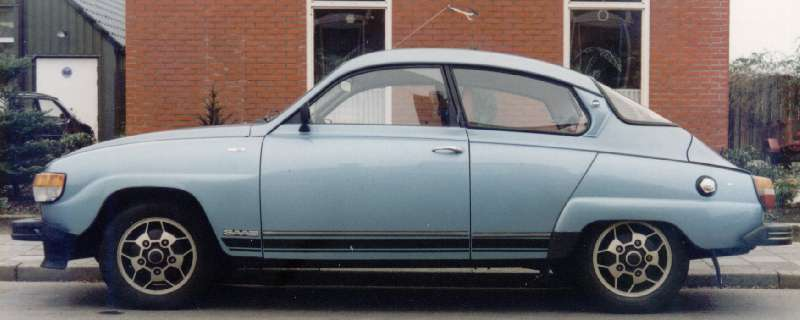
1979 Saab 96GL V4 model, celebrating Saab's 25 years in Netherlands

The Saab 96 had a longitudinally mounted engine layout. As first designed, it had an 841 cc displacement, 38 PS (28 kW) three-cylinder Saab two-stroke engine. By 1965 this was increased to 40 PS (29 kW). An optional 52 PS (38 kW) version of the engine, with triple carburetors and oil injection, was used in the Sport/Monte Carlo models. The additional power was obtained from a modified cylinder head and filled crankshaft counterweights offering higher overall compression ratio. For 1966 models, the standard 96 841 cc engine, using pre-mix oil, appeared with a three throat Solex carburetor in which the center carburetor handled start, idle, and low speed functions, increasing the power to 42 PS (31 kW). The same carburetor had been used in the Sport/Monte Carlo models. A common throttle shaft minimized carburetor synchronization problems.

In 1967, Saab began marketing the 96 V4, with the Ford Taunus V4 engine, a four-stroke 1498 cc V4 engine, originally developed for the 1962 Ford Taunus 15M.

Saab's project to source a four-stroke engine was dubbed 'Operation Kajsa'. The two-stroke option was offered until 1968. Four-stroke engines had been tested before—between 1962 and 1964 Kjell Knutsson and Ingvar Andersson under Rolf Mellde tested three different engines: a 45 PS Lloyd Arabella of 897 cc; a 33 hp BMC A-Series 848-cc engine and a Lancia Appia engine of 1089cc and 48 hp. However Rolf Mellde's view that Saab needed to switch to a four-stroke engine was stopped higher up by CEO Tryggve Holm. Mellde then went behind the back of Holm and made contact with Marc Wallenberg, son of Marcus Wallenberg, Saab's major stockholder. The coup succeeded and testing could begin. The tested engines were Volvo B18, Ford V4, Triumph 1300, Lancia V4 engine, Opel, Volkswagen and Hillman Imp.

The B18 was the most reliable, but the Ford V4 was not far behind and was significantly easier to fit into the engine bay of the 96. The testing was done in secrecy. Per Gillbrand took a leave of absence and said he was going to run his father's paint shop. In reality he went to Desenzano in northern Italy with a 96 V4 prototype for testing. With five months to go before production only seven persons knew about the new engine. To maintain secrecy they rented a house west of Kristinehamn. To keep purchases of V4 specific parts secret they started a front corporation, Maskinverktyg AB (meaning Machine-Tool Company). The ordinary purchase department at Saab was oblivious to what was going on, something that caused an incident when Rune Ahlberg cancelled the orders for cables for the two-stroke engine and the purchase department called the supplier and sharply told them to keep their deliveries. In the last week of July, just before the summer holidays, information about the new engine was released to further people and they were informed that full-scale production would start in four weeks. To keep secrecy, 40 of the ordinary staff were told to report to work to fix a problem with the disc brakes. Just prior to the official introduction, a journalist noticed a lorry loaded with 96s with V4 stickers on the front bumpers.

The ordinary V4 engines produced between 1967 and 1976 had 65 PS (48 kW). Cars from the first year of production had engines with "Ford Motor Company" stampings. For the Swedish 1976 model year, the car—now known as the 96L—had its power reduced to 62 PS due to new Swedish emission regulations. However, the 1977–1980 models had 68 PS (50 kW), due to a two-stage Solex 32TDID carburetor. These models were badged "V4 super". The V4 96 managed 0–100 km/h in 16 seconds. In August 1975 (called "1975B" in Sweden as the less powerful engine was kept for cars marketed after the beginning of the new year, when the new emissions standards took effect), the car received new impact absorbing bumpers similar to those on the 99 and an altered bottom plate which allowed the rear seat to be moved 5 cm (2.0 in) further back.

In the US, the two-stroke engine was called the "Shrike" in 1967 and 1968. Its displacement was reduced slightly for 1968, to 795 cc, to avoid emission regulations which exempted engines under 50 cu in (819 cc). The V4s used in US cars had a 1500 cc high compression engine with 73 hp (54 kW; 74 PS). For the 1971 model year it was switched to a 1700 cc low compression engine, so as not to lose power while meeting new emissions regulations. Stated power dropped to 65 hp (48 kW; 66 PS) for 1972 as SAE gross figures were abandoned in favor of the lower net ratings. 1973 was the last year that the 96/95 were available in the United States.

=== Drive train ===
The Saab 96 and its station wagon sibling, the Saab 95, featured column mounted transmission levers. The gearbox originally had three gears, the first unsynchronised. Later, a four-speed option, with synchromesh on first gear, was offered and the three-speed was phased out.

An unusual feature of the Saab drivetrain was a 'freewheel' (overrunning clutch). This allowed the transmission to run faster than the engine, such as when decelerating, or descending a long hill. Although such freewheels had been provided in other cars before as an economy measure, such as some early post-war Rovers and pre-war Chryslers, they were required in the Saab because of the limited lubrication in the two-stroke engine. A petroil-lubricated two-stroke requires lubrication according to its speed, but provides this lubrication according to the amount of its throttle opening. Where the engine operates at high RPM and low throttle (such as when coasting down a long hill), the lubrication provided may be inadequate. With the freewheel, a coasting engine could reduce its speed to idling, thus requiring only the small lubrication available from the closed, coasting, throttle. In certain higher-performance models and in later two-stroke models, direct injection of oil into the engine from a separate reservoir allowed lubrication to be a function of engine RPM and rendered mixing of oil with gasoline unnecessary.

Freewheeling was retained in the four-stroke variant, until the end of production and in the Saab 99 with the 1709 cc Triumph engine. A minor drawback to the freewheel, particularly for drivers unfamiliar with the Saab, is that it makes engine braking unavailable although it could be manually engaged or disengaged by a control in the foot-well. Fixed wheel disengagement, using the foot, could be difficult, as it involved pulling a 'T handle' intended for manual operation.

== Suspension ==
The front suspension used double wishbones and coil springs, while the rear suspension was a trailing U-beam axle with coil springs. Telescopic dampers were used for all four wheels. Up to model year 1967 models had drum brakes all around. Starting 1967, with the coming of the V4 engine, models were fitted with front disc brakes.

== Saab 96 in rallies ==
The Saab 96 was driven most famously by Erik Carlsson, in many international rallies. His most famous successes were first in the 1960, 1961 and 1962 RAC Rallies and first in the 1962 and 1963 Monte Carlo Rallies. It was these successive, top-level victories that put the Saab 96 'on the map' and established its reputation for reliability and toughness. Carlsson also competed in the East African Safari Rally, finishing second in 1964. Famous rallying names such as Simo Lampinen, Per Eklund, Pat Moss-Carlsson, Tom Trana, Stig Blomqvist and Carl Orrenius have also been connected with the Saab 96.

=== WRC victories ===
No.	Event	Season	Driver	Co-driver	Car
1	(Sweden) 23rd International Swedish Rally	1972	(Sweden) Stig Blomqvist	(Sweden) Arne Hertz	Saab 96 V4
2	(Sweden) 24th International Swedish Rally	1973	(Sweden) Stig Blomqvist	(Sweden) Arne Hertz	Saab 96 V4
3	(Sweden) 26th International Swedish Rally	1976	(Sweden) Per Eklund	(Sweden) Björn Cederberg	Saab 96 V4

== Land speed record ==
On August 16, 2011 a 1966 Saab 96 driven by Alex LaFortune set a new speed record at the Bonneville Salt Flats for stock body production cars with 750 cc engines at 110.113 MPH.

== Production numbers ==
The last production date for the Saab 96 was January 11, 1980 (VIN 96806002814), the last VIN (96806002820) was produced on January 3, 1980. These cars were built by Valmet Automotive in Uusikaupunki, Finland.

The Saab 96 was succeeded by the Saab 99, introduced in 1967, and subsequently by the Saab 900, introduced in 1978. A total of 547,221 were made. Its place at the Uusikaupunki plant was taken over by the similar sized Talbot Horizon.

== Postage stamps ==
The Saab 96 features on several postage stamps. A Monte-Carlo Rally Saab 96, driven by Erik Carlsson, appears on a Swedish stamp.

== See also ==
- Saab 60
- Saab 98
