= Saab Granturismo =

Automobile by Saab

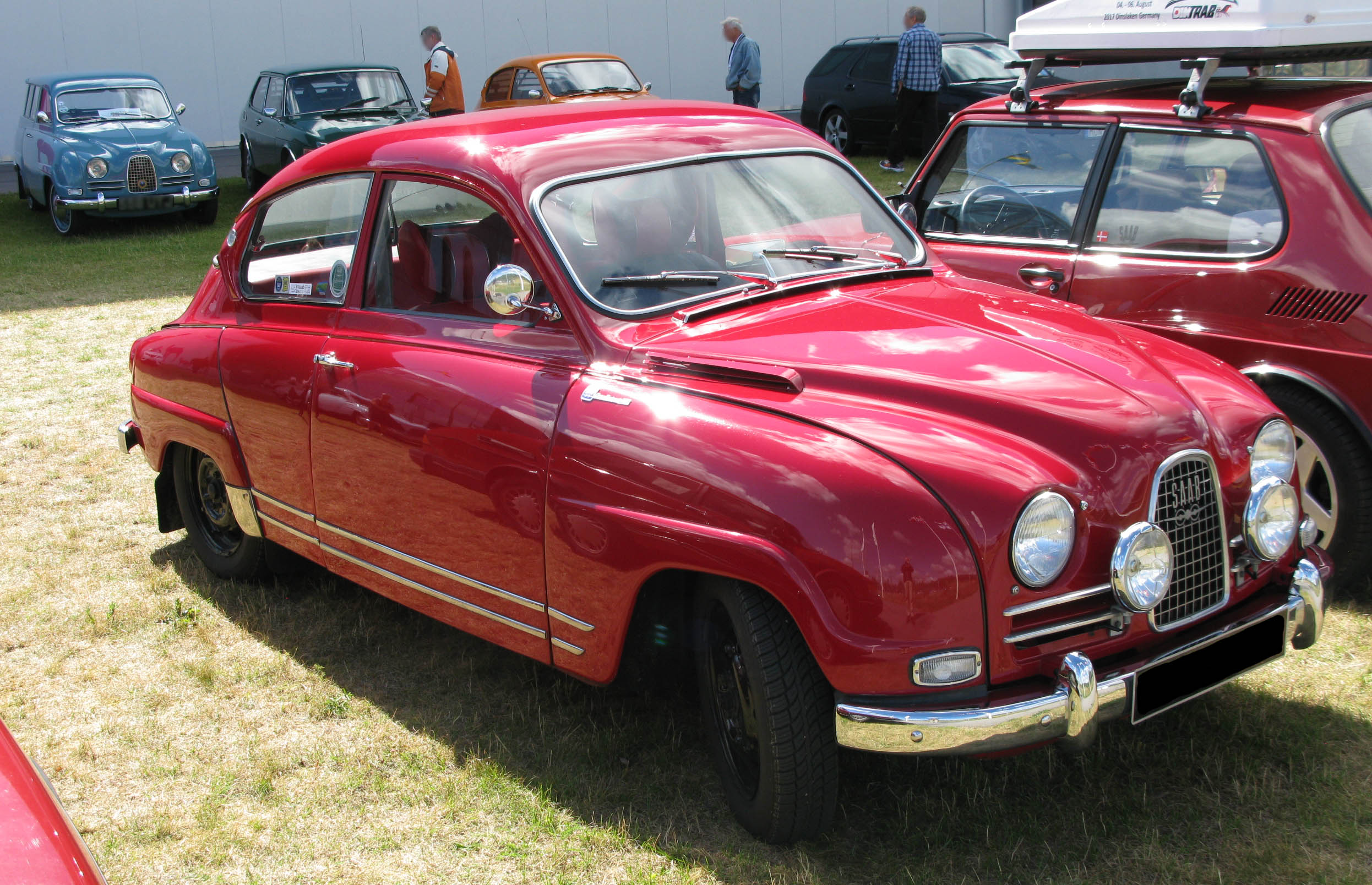
- Saab Granturismo 850

Overview
- Manufacturer: Saab Automobile
- Also called: Saab GT750; Saab GT850; Saab Sport; Saab Monte Carlo
- Production: 1958–1968
- Assembly: Sweden: Trollhättan Assembly
- Designer: Sixten Sason

Body and chassis
- Class: Compact
- Body style: 2-door coupe
- Layout: Front-engine, front-wheel-drive
- Related: Saab 93; Saab 96

Powertrain
- Engine: 748-cc and 841-cc three-cylinder Saab two-strokes 1,498-cc Ford Taunus V4 engine
- Transmission: 3-speed manual 4-speed manual

The Saab Granturismo (also Monte Carlo and Sport) was a series of up-powered sedans sold by Saab Automobile AB from 1958 to 1968. They were powered by three-cylinder, two-stroke engines until the 1967 model year. Most variants were distinguished from the standard model by twin metal stripes along the rocker panels.

== Saab 93-based variant ==
The Granturismo 750 was a performance version of the Saab 93, which was introduced at the New York International Auto Show in 1956 and produced until 1960. The Saab 93 offered seat belts in 1958, which only became required on US models in 1973.

The Granturismo model shared multiple features in common with the standard model, including front drum brakes. Upgraded features included a wood-rim steering wheel, a Halda Speedpilot timing device (used in rally racing), sport seats, driving lamps and metal trim along the rocker panels. Rear-hinged doors were offered on the 1958 model year only. Of the 600 Granturismo 750s built in 1958 and 1959, 546 were exported to the US.

Its augmented-output Saab two-stroke engine featured a 9:1 compression ratio, a two-barrel Solex carburetor, a tuned exhaust system, and twin fuel pumps to develop 50 hp (37 kW). An optional twin-carburetor Saab Competition tuning kit boosted engine power boosted to 57 hp (43 kW). The engine gave most power at high revs, 3400 to 5000 rpm. Engine lubrication was supplied by mixing two-stroke oil with the gasoline in the fuel tank at a three-percent ratio. The gearbox had three speeds. In order to overcome the problem of lubrication for the two-stroke engine when the rpm exceeded that required by the throttle setting (owing to the reduction of oil being delivered with the fuel), a freewheel device was fitted.

== Saab 96-based variants ==
Swedish rally champion, Erik Carlsson, won three Royal Automobile Club rallies in a 1960 Saab 96, which became the basis for the 1960 and 1961 Granturismo 750. The Saab 96-based model had a four-speed transmission with freewheeling, and chrome wheel trim and venting rear quarter windows.

It was succeeded by the Saab Sport in 1962, also based on the Saab 96, with slight modifications and with a different interior configuration and equipment. The engine was upgraded to an 841 cc two-stroke three-cylinder engine with one Solex carburetor per cylinder, giving 57 hp (43 kW). The engine was lubricated via an oil injection system, fed from a separate tank for two-stroke oil, obviating the need to mix oil with gasoline in the fuel tank. The car also used disc brakes at the front, something that was unusual at the time, and the wheels had four studs instead of the five used on the 96 and were of a stronger build, to withstand the extra workload.

- From 1963 on, the model for the USA market was named Granturismo 850.
- In the 1965 model year power output was raised to 60 hp (45 kW).
- From model year 1966 all market variants were named Monte Carlo 850 (after the successes in the Monte Carlo Rally).
- During model year 1967 the two-stroke models were phased out and replaced with the Monte Carlo V4 (with the 65 hp (48 kW) Ford Taunus V4 engine).
- Production ended in 1968.

== Gallery ==
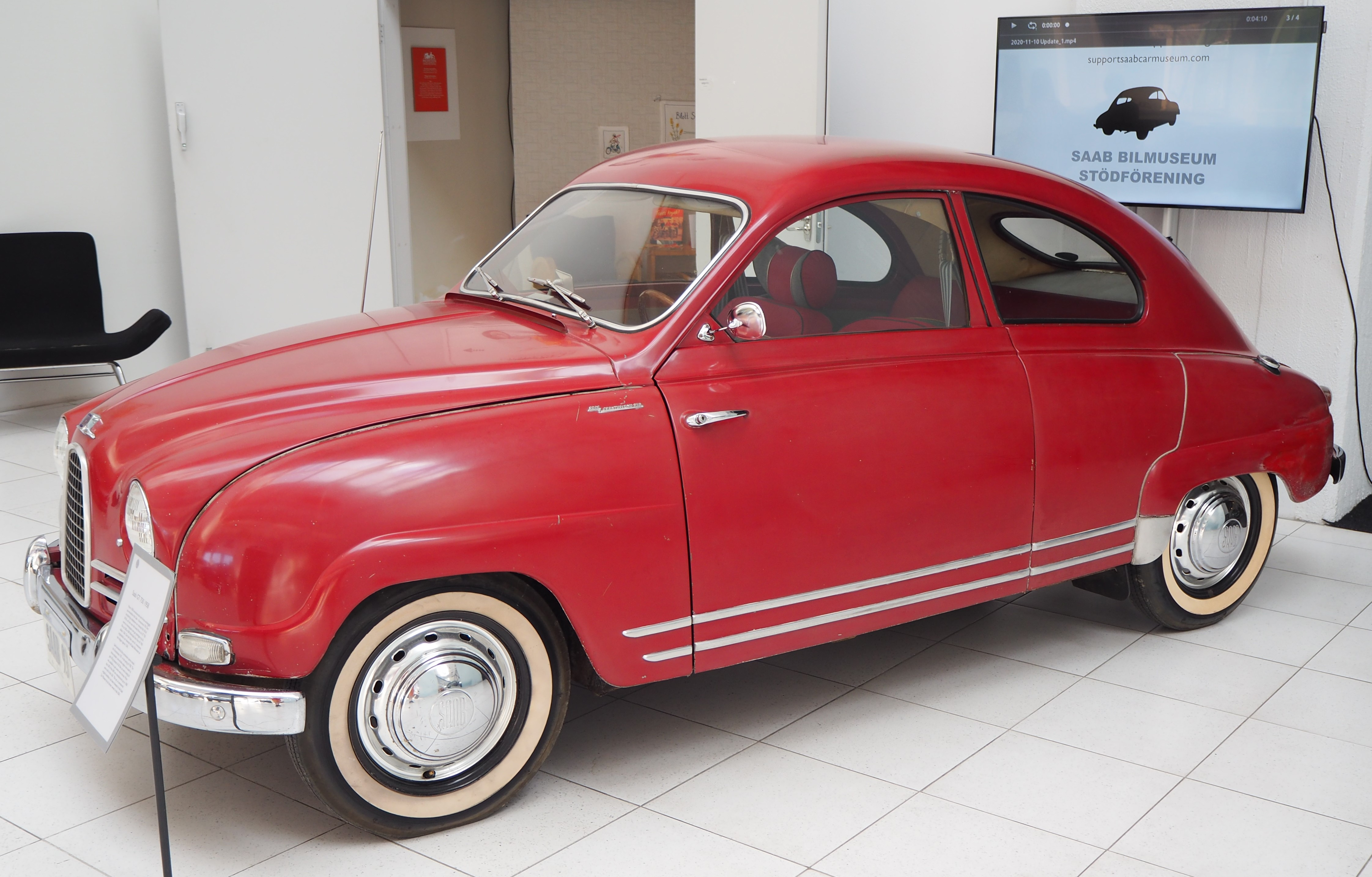
Saab 93-based Granturismo 750

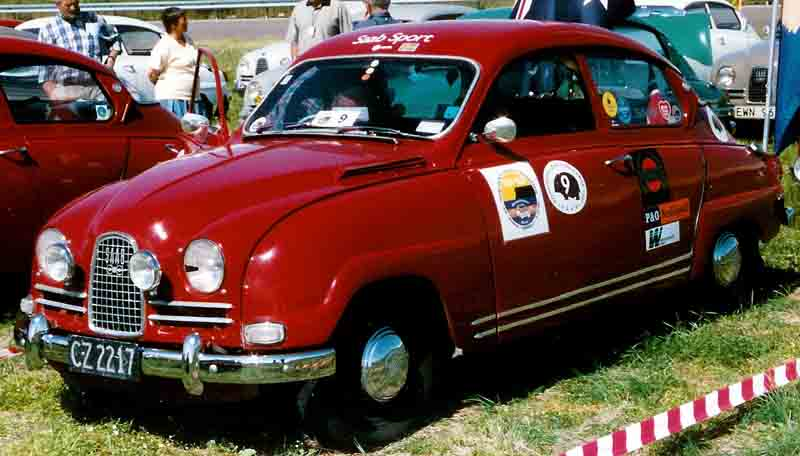
Pre-1965 Saab 96-based Sport with short nose

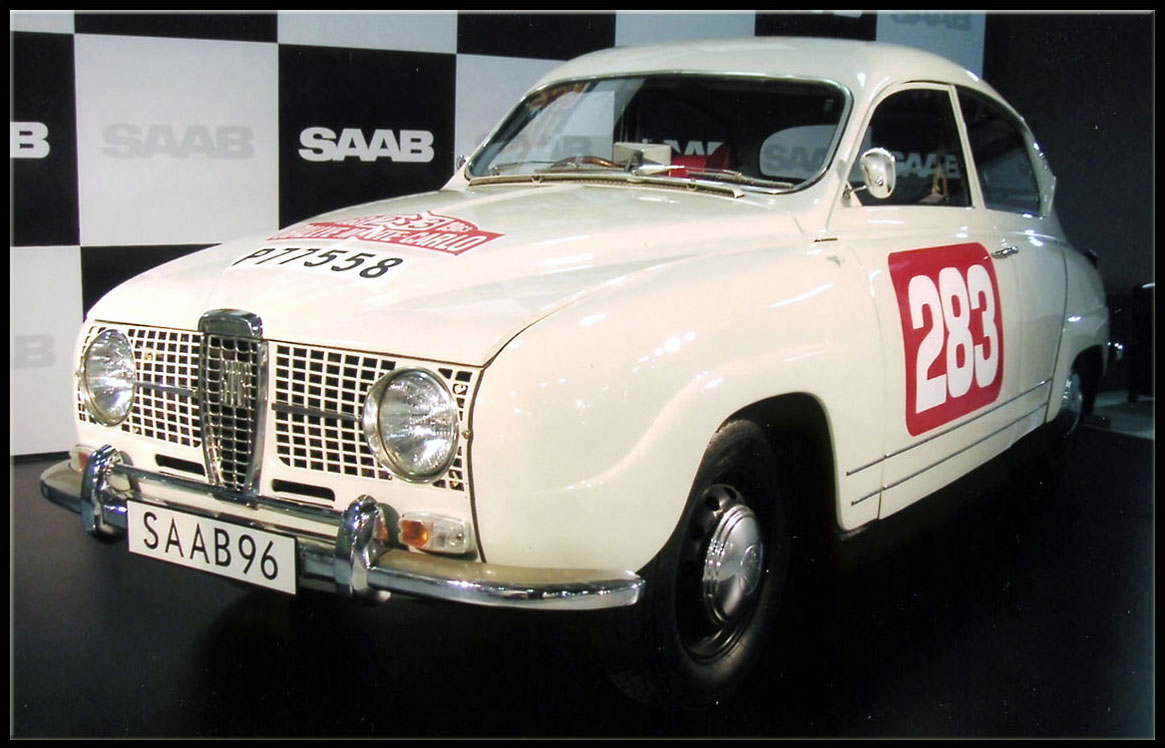
Post-1965 Saab 96-based Sport with long nose

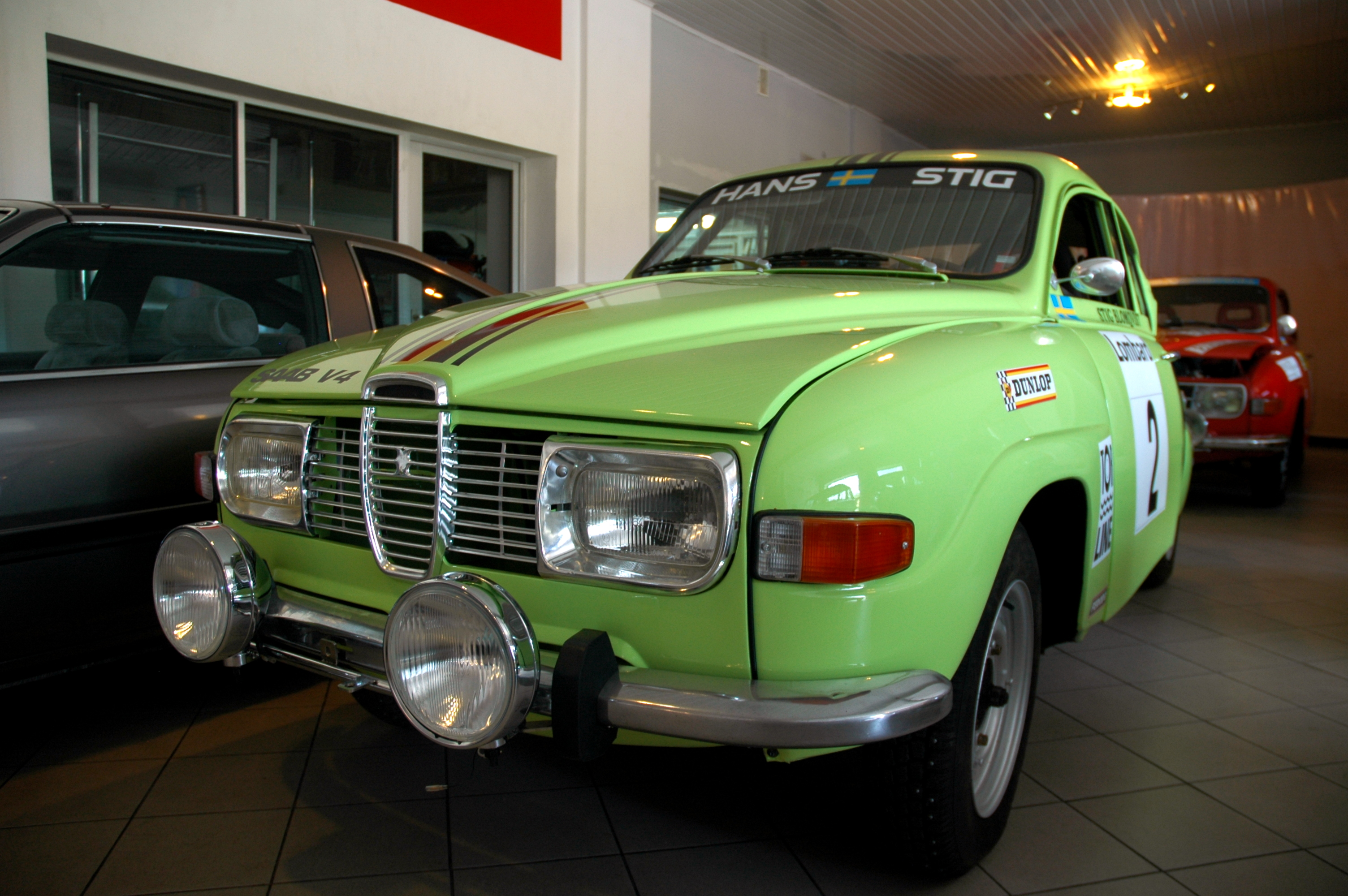
Saab V4 Monte Carlo

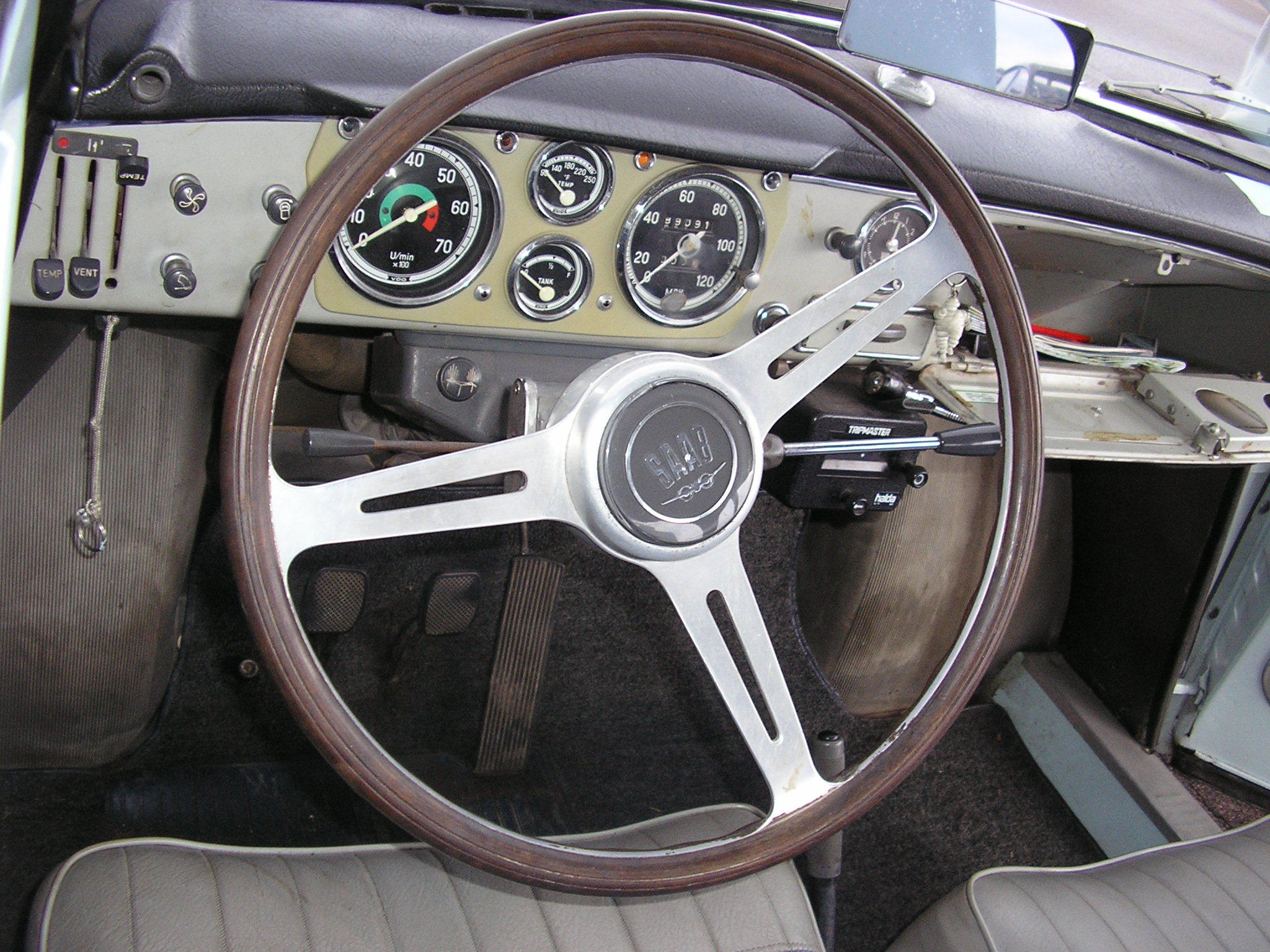
Saab GT850 dashboard
