= Trollhättan Assembly =

Automobile factory in Trollhättan, Sweden

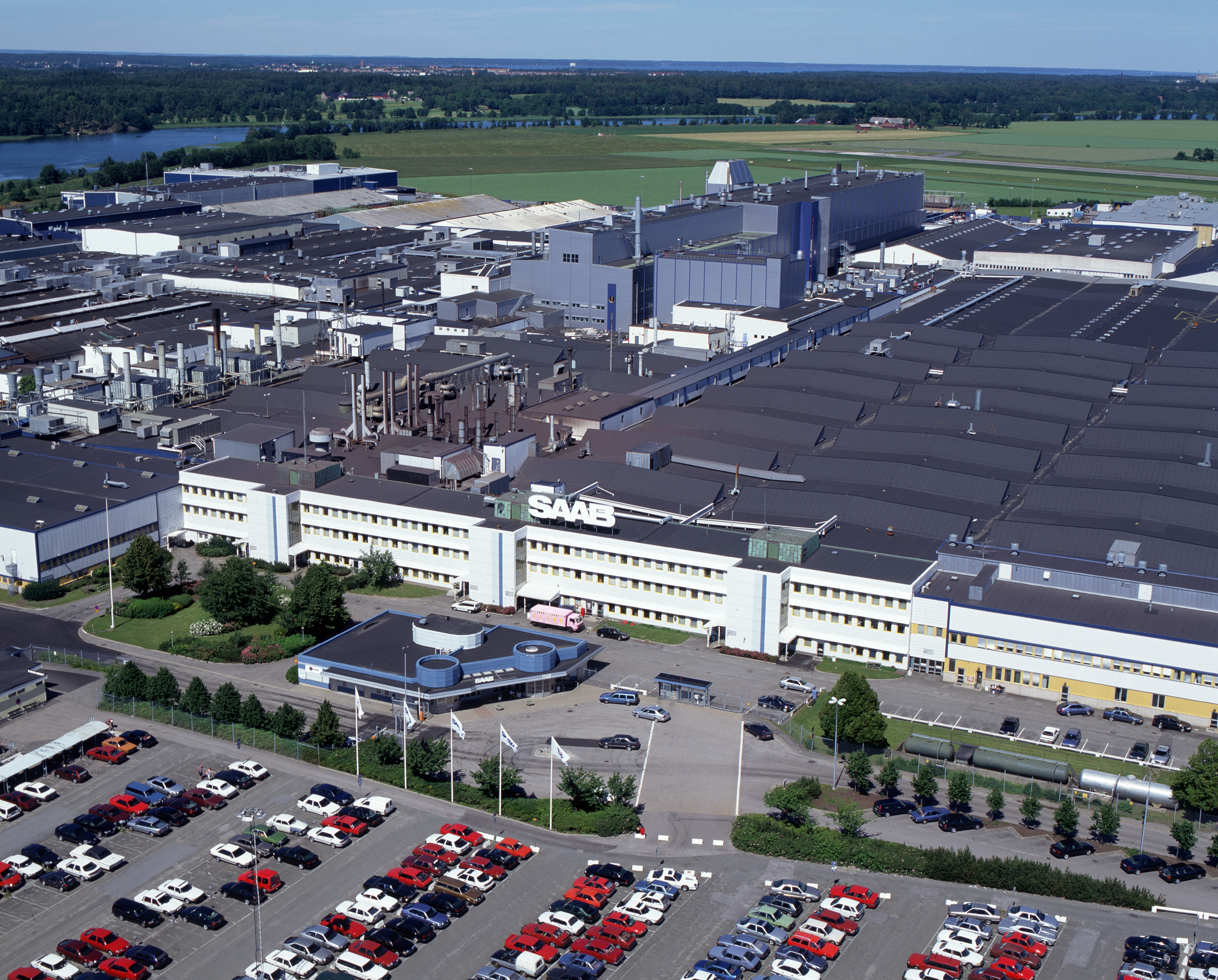
- Partial view of Trollhättan assembly
- Built: 1947
- Location: Trollhättan, Trollhättan Municipality, Västra Götaland County, Sweden
- Coordinates: 58.314°N 12.323°E
- Industry: Automotive
- Products: Cars
- Employees: 347
- Address: Saabvägen 5, SE-461 38 Trollhättan

Trollhättan Assembly is an automobile factory in Trollhättan, Sweden. The factory opened in 1947 under the ownership of Saab AB, then passing to Saab Automobile. From 1989 to 2010, the factory was partially (1989–1999), then completely (2000–2010) owned by General Motors. In 2010, Saab was sold to Spyker Cars. The plant ended production in 2011 and restarted in 2013, after the NEVS purchase of Saab Automobile. The Trollhättan complex, including the assembly, became the sole site of all Saab engineering and manufacturing activities. After NEVS announced its closure in March 2023, the factory was sold to Stenhaga Invest AB, with both Polestar and EV Electra showing interest in buying the factory.

It was founded on the site of Trollhättan airfield, by the aircraft manufacturer Svenska Aeroplan Aktiebolaget (Saab AB), an aircraft manufacturer since 1937 and based in Linköping, Sweden. The first automobile off the line was the Saab 92, a front-wheel drive, two-stroke, transverse-engined passenger vehicle.

== Former products ==
- Saab 9-2X Sport wagon
- Saab 9-3 Sport Sedan
- Saab 9-3 EV Sport Sedan (based on the 2014 year model)
- Saab 9-3 SportCombi and Convertible
- Saab 9-5 Sport sedan and SportCombi
- Saab 9-7X SUV
- Saab 92
- Saab 93
- Saab 95 Combi
- Saab 96
- Saab 99
- Saab 900
- Saab 9000
- Cadillac BLS

== See also ==
- List of GM factories
- GM Europe
