= Saab 93 =

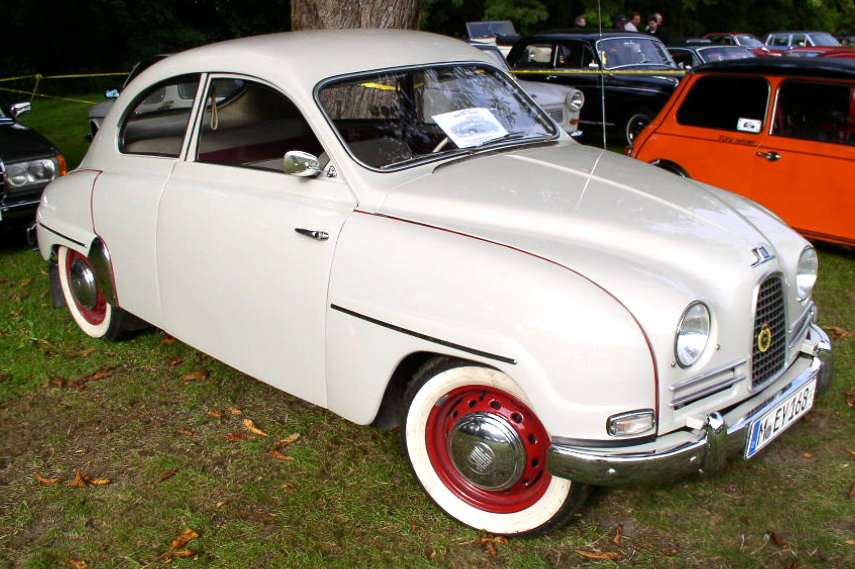
- Saab 93

Overview
- Manufacturer: Saab Automobile
- Also called: Saab 93b; Saab 93f
- Production: December 1955–1960
- Assembly: Sweden: Trollhättan (Trollhättan Assembly)
- Designer: Sixten Sason

Body and chassis
- Class: Small family car (C)
- Body style: 2-door coupé
- Layout: Longitudinal front-engine, front-wheel drive
- Doors: Suicide doors (93 and 93b); Conventional doors (93f)
- Related: Saab 95; Saab Granturismo; Saab Sonett

Powertrain
- Engine: 750 cc Saab 2-stroke I3 (gasoline)
- Transmission: 3-speed manual

Dimensions
- Wheelbase: 2,489 mm (98.0 in)
- Length: 4,007 mm (157.8 in)
- Width: 1,581 mm (62.2 in)
- Height: 1,448 mm (57.0 in)
- Kerb weight: 787 kg (1,735 lb)

Chronology
- Predecessor: Saab 92
- Successor: Saab 96

The Saab 93 (pronounced ninety-three) is the second production automobile that was manufactured by Swedish automaker Saab. Styled by Sixten Sason, it was first presented on December 1, 1955. The 93 was powered by a longitudinally-mounted three-cylinder 748 cc Saab two-stroke engine giving 33 hp (25 kW). The gearbox had three gears, the first unsynchronised. In order to overcome the problems of oil starvation on overrun (engine braking) for the two-stroke engine, a freewheel device was fitted. In 1957, two-point seatbelts were introduced as an option. The 93 was the first Saab to be exported from Sweden, with most exports going to the United States. A Saxomat clutch and a cabrio coach (large cloth sunroof) were available as options.

1957 Saab 93A rear 3/4 view

On September 2, 1957, the 93B was introduced. The original two-piece windshield was also replaced with a one-piece windshield.

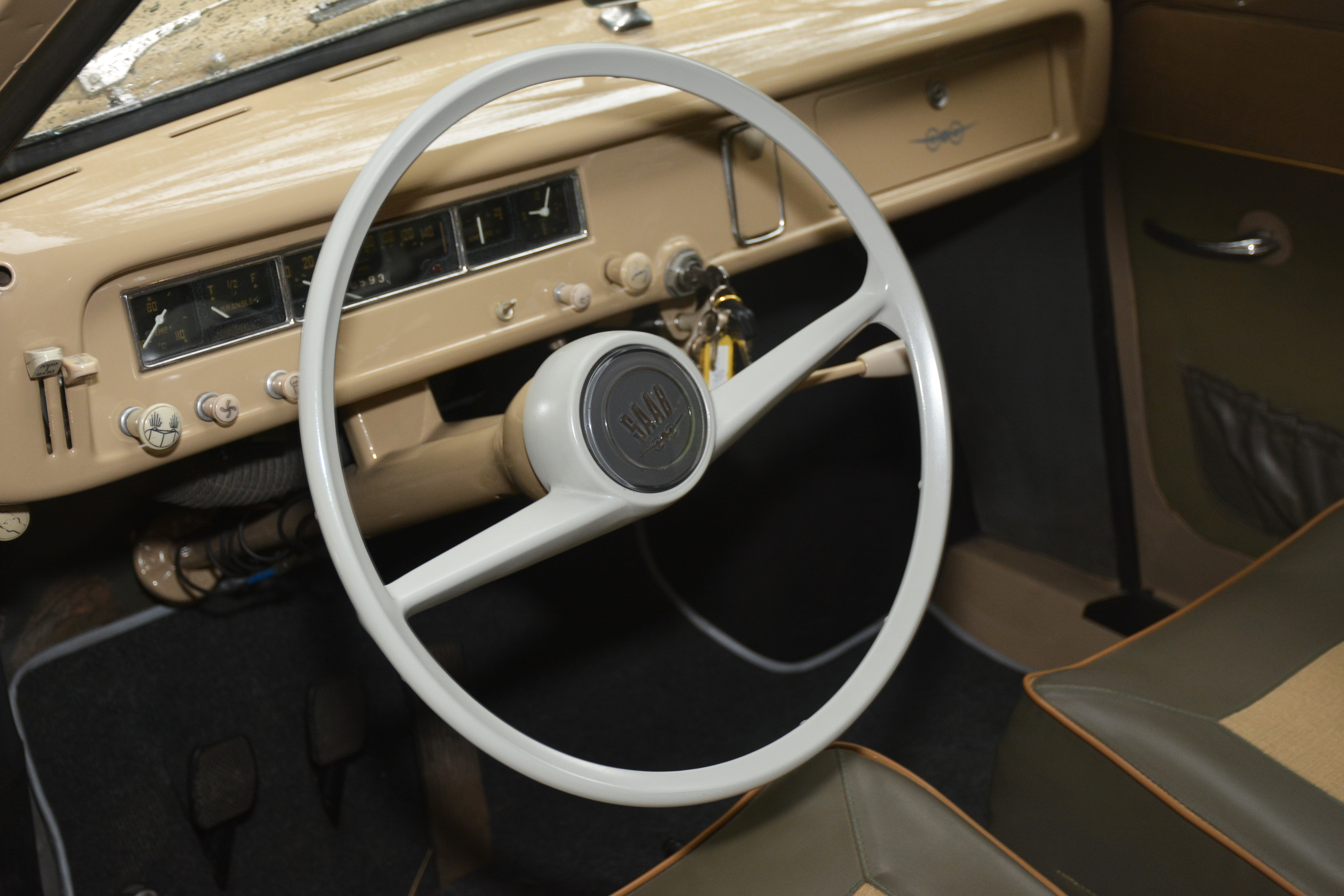
Interior

In late 1959, the 93F was introduced, featuring front-hinged doors from the Saab GT750. 1960 was the last year of production for the 93. The 93 was replaced by the Saab 96, although the two models were sold side by side for the earlier part of the year. A total of 52,731 Saab 93s were made.

The Saab Sonett I roadster shared many of its components with the 93.

== Motorsport history ==
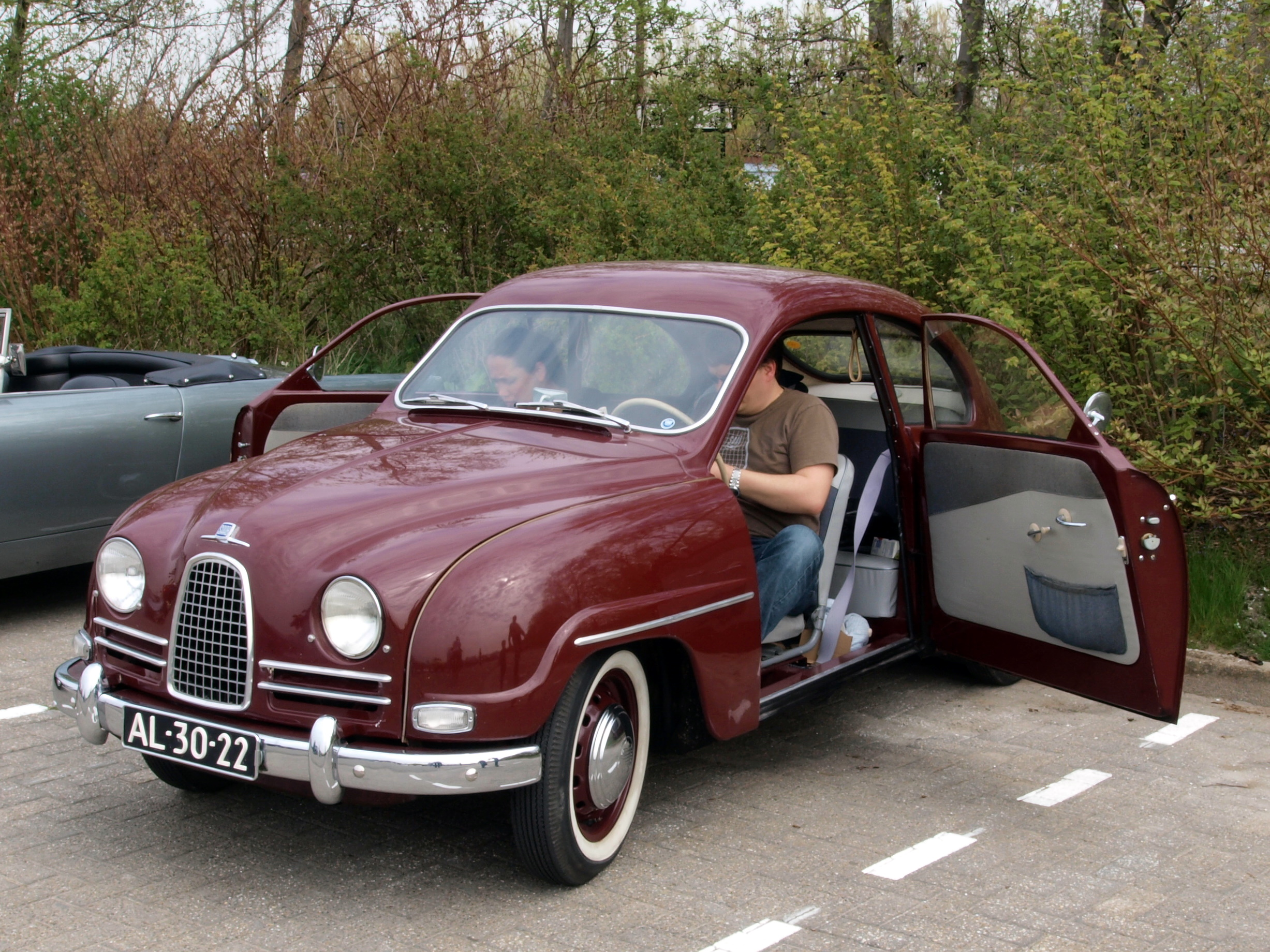
1958 Saab 93B De Luxe with its suicide doors open

In 1957, Erik Carlsson finished 1st in the Finland Rally in a Saab 93; in 1959, he was 1st in the Swedish Rally, also in a Saab 93. However, Saab was not the first Swedish manufacturer to win the Swedish Rally. Saab's long-standing Swedish rival, Volvo, had beaten them consecutively in 1957 and 1958 with the PV544.

=== 1956 ===
- Wiesbaden Rallye, Germany (June 24, 1956)
  - 1st Bengt Jonsson and Kjell Persson
- Rally Viking, Norway
  - 1st Carl-Magnus Skogh
  - 2nd Erik Carlsson
  - 4th Ivar Andersson
- Rikspokalen, Sweden
  - 1st Erik Carlsson
- Scandiatrofén, Sweden
  - 1st Erik Carlsson and Carl-Magnus Skogh (shared)
- Tour d'Europe Continental
  - 2nd Rolf Mellde and Sverker Benson
- Tulpen Rally, The Netherlands
  - 2nd Sture Nottorp and Charlie Lohmander
  - 3rd Gunnar Bengtsson and Sven Zetterberg
  - 7th Bengt Jonsson and Sölve Relve

=== 1957 ===
- Mille Miglia, Turismo Preparato 750 cc, Italy
  - 1st Charlie Lohmander and Harald Kronegård
- GAMR - Great American Mountain Rallye, US
  - 1st Bob Wehman and Louis Braun, US
  - 1st Best marque team
  - 6th Rolf Mellde and Morrow Mushkin
  - 17th Jerry Jankowitz and Doris Jankowitz
- 1000 Lakes Rally, Finland
  - 1st Erik Carlsson
  - 1st Best marque team Erik Carlsson, Carl Otto Bremer, Harald Kronegård
  - 1st Finnish champion, Carl Otto Bremer
- Rallye Adriatique, Yugoslavia
  - 1st R M Hopfen
- Lime Rock Rally, US
  - 1st Bob Wehman
- Rikspokalen, Sweden
  - 1st Carl-Magnus Skogh
- Finnish Snow Rallye, Finland
  - 2nd Erik Carlsson
- Acropolis Rally Greece
  - 2nd Henri Blanchoud
- Rallye Atlas-Oasis, Morocco
  - 2nd Harald Kronegård and Leonce Beysson

=== 1959 ===
- 24 Hours of Le Mans
  - 2nd in its class and 12th total

=== 1960 ===
- Finnish Snow Rallye, Finland
  - 1st Carl Otto Bremer

=== 2008 ===
- 24 hours Le Mans Classic, compensated
  - 1st in its class and 2nd overall

=== 2010 ===
- Le Mans Classic, compensated
  - 5th
