= Rolf Mellde =

Swedish automotive engineer (1922–2009)

- Born: 1922
- Died: March 2009 (aged 86–87)
- Education: Stockholms Tekniska Institut (STI)
- Occupation(s): Engineer, performance engines, car racing enthusiast

Rolf Mellde (1922 – March 2009) was an engineer who specialized in performance engines and also a car racing enthusiast.

== Early life ==
Mellde's grandfather August Johansson built one of the first cars in Stockholm and sold it to Lars Magnus Ericsson. Mellde's father, Evald Johansson, taught car mechanics at a school in Stockholm. Following his father, Mellde started drawing turbo compressors and diesel engines at the age of ten.

After finishing his basic education, Mellde studied thermodynamics for two years at the Stockholms Tekniska Institut (STI) under Folke Mannerstedt (race driver and engine designer) and Nils Gustafsson. His first job was at Bergbolagen in Lindesberg that made engine powered inspection trollies. After that he worked two years at Skandiaverken in Lysekil working with two stroke boat engines.

== Work at Saab ==
Mellde started working at SAAB in September 1946 and was put in charge of engine development.

In 1948, he started his competition career in a DKW in Skarpnäck. When he became head of testing, he suggested that SAAB participate in automotive competitions to show off SAAB's engines. In 1950, SAAB entered the Rikspokalen and won. SAAB won eight times up to the final Rikspokalen in 1961.

In the 1960s it became harder to sell two stroke cars and Rolf Mellde went ahead with his idea to test a four stroke engine. They had tested several four strokers and the one that was best was the Ford V4. the board were invited to drive a test car but none of them wanted to. Tryggve Holm even thought the idea of a SAAB with a Ford engine was absurd. Lars Brising refused to state his opinion. The Saab management instead wanted him to continue working with the Saab 99.

Having no luck, Mellde talked with Marc Wallenberg who used to drive a Saab 92. Marc talked with his father and Rolf got the go ahead with the V4 engine. Even before the go ahead, Rolf had secretly visited Ford in Detroit and asked both Don Fray, then head of Ford US, and Fray contacted Robert McNamara, head of Ford, and he had nothing against selling the engine to Saab. The price would be the same Ford charged their own daughter companies.

The switch to the V4 was done under great secrecy. Just before the factory closed for the summer in 1966, a number of workers were asked if they were willing to work on some 96s that had "faulty brakes". 40 workers volunteered and then Svante Holm explained that the real reason was that they would take the unsold cars and refit them with V4 engines. 600 cars were rebuilt and the V4 Saabs became a big hit and outsold the two-strokers by a factor of three.

== Work at Volvo ==
Shortly after, Curt Mileikowsky came in from ASEA. Mileikowsky knew nothing about cars and Rolf left to work at Volvo after 25 years at SAAB. At Volvo, Rolf saw what was to be the replacement of the Volvo 140, a huge car powered by a cast V8 engine. Rolf quickly formed a group to work on the new 200-series, Jan Willsgård designed a new front and the V8 was changed to an inline 4. At Volvo he worked to improve safety and also worked on an experimental front wheel drive taxi cab. In 1979, he led the project team on the light component project (LCP) that produced the LCP2000 concept cars displayed at motor shows around the world in 1983. The car featured a very light diesel engine with direct fuel injection that gave very good fuel efficiency, as high as 33.3 kilometres per litre (94 mpg_{‑imp}; 78 mpg_{‑US}).

== Later life ==
Mellde died in March 2009 at 86 years of age.
