= Rikspokalen =

Motor rally in Örebro, Sweden

The Rikspokalen is a motor rally held in Örebro, Sweden. It is organised by SMK Örebro and is considered one of the traditional rally events in the region.

== History ==
The rally’s name roughly translates from Swedish as “State’s Cup”. The event dates back to the post‑war period, with one of its earliest known editions held in 1946.

== Overall results 1946‑61 ==
Year	1st place	2nd place	3rd place
1946	Olle Landbu (DKW F8 Meisterklasse)	Per‑Frederik Cederbaum (Willys Jeep MB)	Bengt Carlqvist (Volvo PV53)
1949	Rune Andersson (1939 Ford Anglia)	K V Andersson (Citroën 11CV)	Gösta Bergqvist
1950	Rolf Mellde (Saab 92)		
1951	Bengt Reander (Ford Anglia)		
1952	Gunnar Källström (Volkswagen 1200)	Lasse Pettersson	Helmuth Fahlen
1953	Allan Borgefors (Volkswagen 1200)	Arne Larsson (Volkswagen 1200)	Gunnar Källström (Volkswagen 1200)
1954	Gunnar Nilsson (Fiat 1100)	Allan Borgefors (Volkswagen 1200)	Gunnar Källström (Volkswagen 1200)
1955	Erik Carlsson (Saab 92)	Carl‑Gunnar Hammarlund (Porsche 356B 1500)	Grus‑Olle Persson (Porsche 356B 1500)
1956	Erik Carlsson (Saab 93)		
1957	Carl‑Magnus Skogh (Saab 93B)		
1958	Carl‑Magnus Skogh (Saab 93B)		
1959	Carl‑Magnus Skogh (Saab 93B)		
1960	Carl‑Magnus Skogh (Saab 96)		
1961	Carl‑Magnus Skogh (Saab 96)		
