= Solex (manufacturer) =

French automotive parts manufacturer

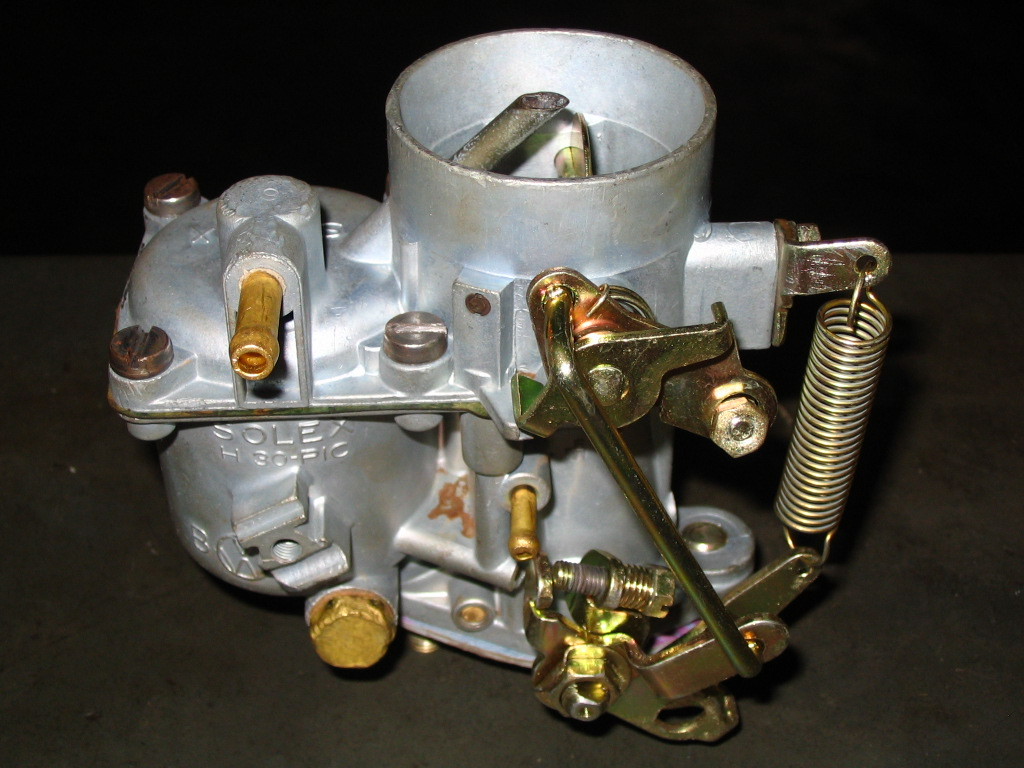
Solex H30 as fitted to a 1970 Volkswagen Beetle

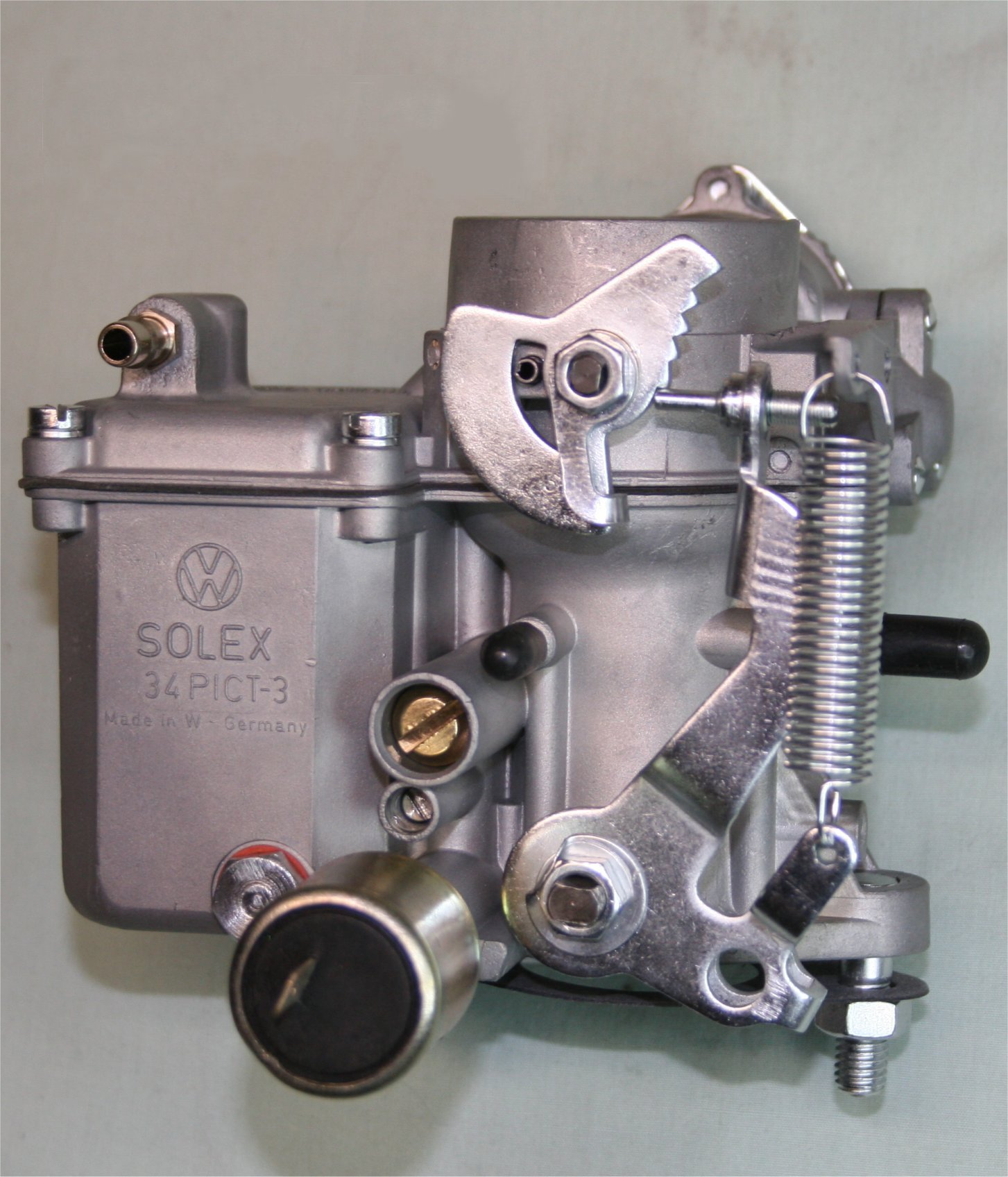
VW-marked Solex carburetor as used on aircooled Beetles from 1970 onwards

Solex was a French manufacturer of carburetors and gasoline powered bicycles.

Solex carburetors were used by many European automotive companies including Rolls-Royce Motors, Land Rover, Mercedes-Benz, Volkswagen, and Porsche, and were also licensed to Japanese maker Mikuni. However, they are no longer made by any derivation of the original French firm.

The company discontinued operations in France in 1988. Starting in 1992, it underwent a series of acquisitions and name changes. When ownership fell under the Magneti Marelli umbrella, production shifted to China and Hungary. Production in Hungary was discontinued in 2002, and then resumed in France in 2005 with a line of gasoline and electric-powered bikes and mopeds being sold, as of 2021, under the VéloSoleX name as part of the EasyBike Group.

== History ==
The Solex company was founded by Marcel Mennesson and Maurice Goudard to manufacture vehicle radiators. These were fitted to several makes of early cars including Delaunay-Belleville and buses of the Paris General Omnibus company.

After World War I, the radiator business went into decline and the company bought the rights to the carburetor patents of Jouffret and Renée and named them Solex after their business.

The Solex brand is now owned by Magneti Marelli. The original Solex company changed its name in 1994 to Magneti Marelli France and on May 31, 2001, Magneti Marelli France partially bought its assets (including the trademark SOLEX) from Magneti Marelli Motopropulsion France S.A.S.

=== Carburetors ===
Solex carburetors were widely used by many European makers and under license to Mikuni in Asia until the mid-1980s when fuel injection was widely adopted. Among the European companies which used Solex carburetors were: Rolls-Royce Motors, Alfa Romeo, Bristol, Fiat, Audi, Ford, BMW, Citroën, Opel, Simca, Saab, Singer Motors, Renault, Peugeot, Lancia, Land Rover Series, Lada, Mercedes-Benz, Volvo, Volkswagen, Zündapp and Porsche.

Solex carburetors have been made under licence by a number of companies including Mikuni of Japan, which entered into a licensed manufacturing agreement with Solex in 1960 and further developed many of Solex's original designs. Japanese automakers and motorcycle manufacturers using Mikuni carburetors included: Toyota, Mitsubishi, Suzuki, Nissan, and Yamaha.

=== Powered bicycles ===
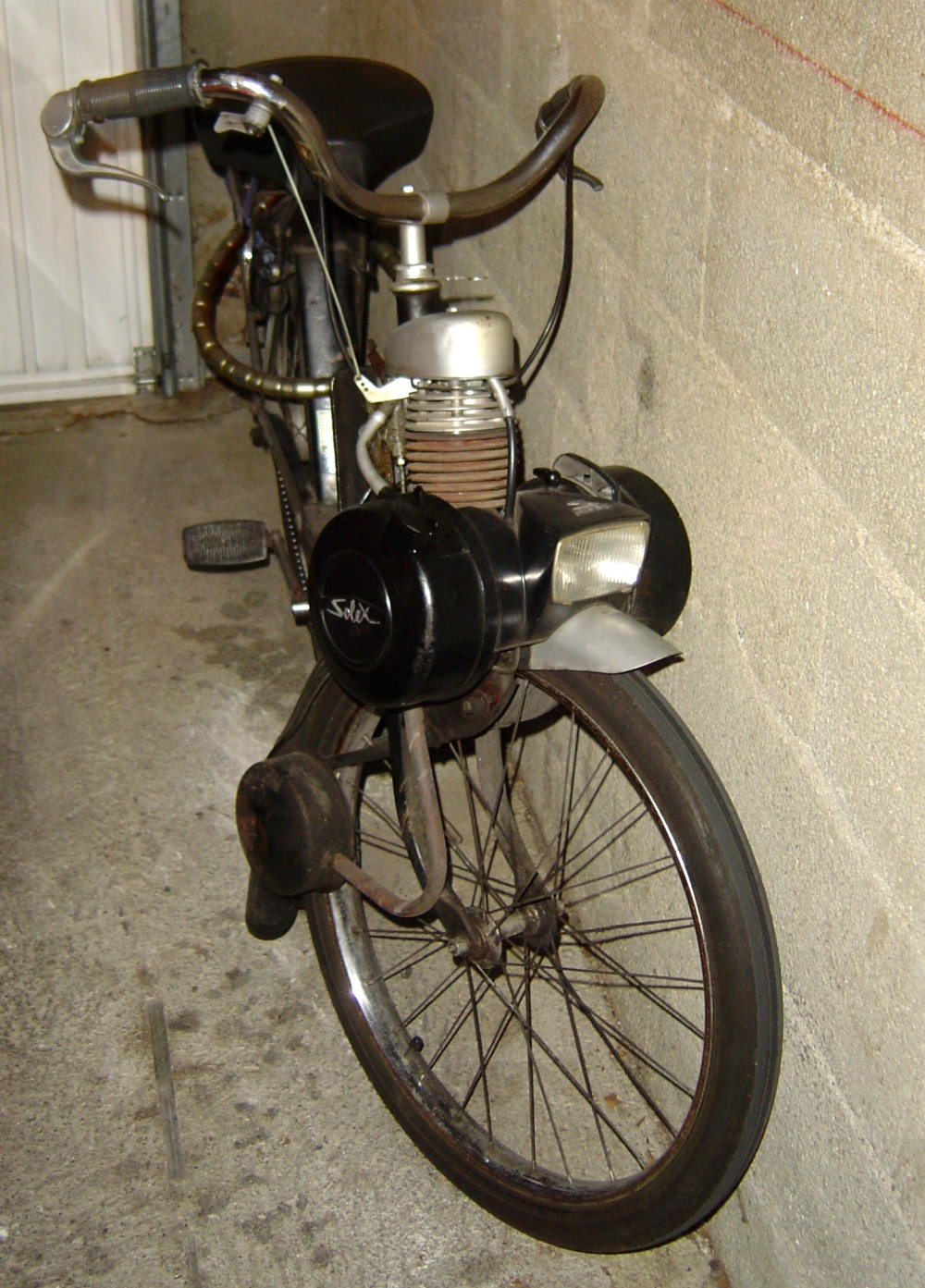
Solex S3800

The VéloSoleX has a 49 cc (3.0 cu in) motor mounted above the front wheel. Power is delivered via a small ceramic roller that rotates directly on the front wheel by friction to the tire.

The first prototype of a VéloSoleX was created in 1941 and used regular bicycle frames such as those under the Alcyon brand and were powered by a 45 cc (2.7 cu in) engine developed by Solex. VéloSoleX were produced commercially and sold starting in 1946 with a 45-cc engine without clutch, then later with a 49-cc engine. The solex, although not varying much from one version to the next, was sold in these models:

- 1946–53: 45 cc
- 1953–55: 330 (first 49 cc engine; no clutch)
- 1955–57: 660
- 1957–58: 1010
- 1958–59: 1400
- 1959–61: 1700 (first version equipped with a clutch)
- 1961–64: 2200
- 1964–66: 3300 (first frame with a square section)
- 1966–88: 3800
- 1971–88: 5000

Export versions were also created (sold outside France)

- 3800 Export
- 4600 (V3 Sold only in the US)
- 5000

Current version (made in France)

- 2007–2011: VéloSoleX 4800

More than eight million were eventually sold, mostly in Europe. It was also constructed under licence in many countries. Today, the VéloSoleX is again manufactured in France. The trademark "VELOSOLEX" is the property of Velosolex America, LLC which markets the VéloSoleX motorized bicycle worldwide.

== Company timeline ==
- 1905: The company was created by Maurice Goudard and Marcel Mennesson, both graduates of the École Centrale Paris.
- 1973: the carburetor division is taken over by Matra, and later by Magneti Marelli, then by Renault and Motobécane in 1974.
- 1983: Motobécane is bought by Yamaha and becomes MBK.
- 1988: production in France, at Saint-Quentin, ends.
- Circa 2001 production ceased in China and restarted in France.
- In June 2004, the mark "Solex" was bought by Valeo
- In October 2005 Valeo launched the e-Solex, designed by Pininfarina and produced in China (400 W brushless electric motor, 35 km/h, autonomy of 30 km)
- In 2009, CIBIÉ launches the e-Solex 2.0, a new version with a lithium polymer battery
