= Saab 98 =

Swedish car prototype

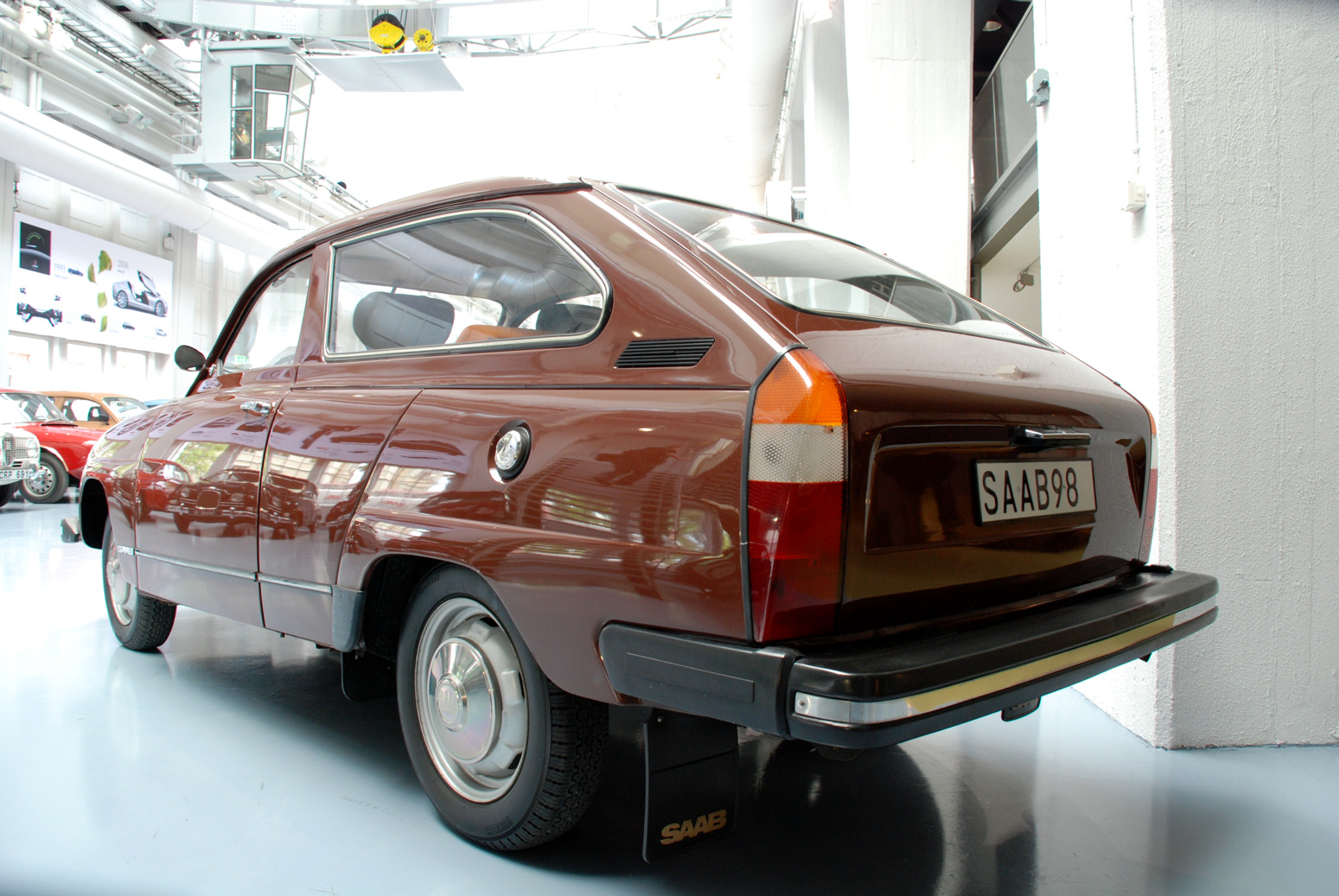
Saab 98 in the Saab Museum

The Saab 98 was an automobile built by Saab in 1974 which never reached full production. Originally it was called X14, designed by Björn Envall as a combi coupé based on the Saab 95 and using its floorpan. The prototype was assembled by Sergio Coggiola, who had already done work on the Saab Sonett III.

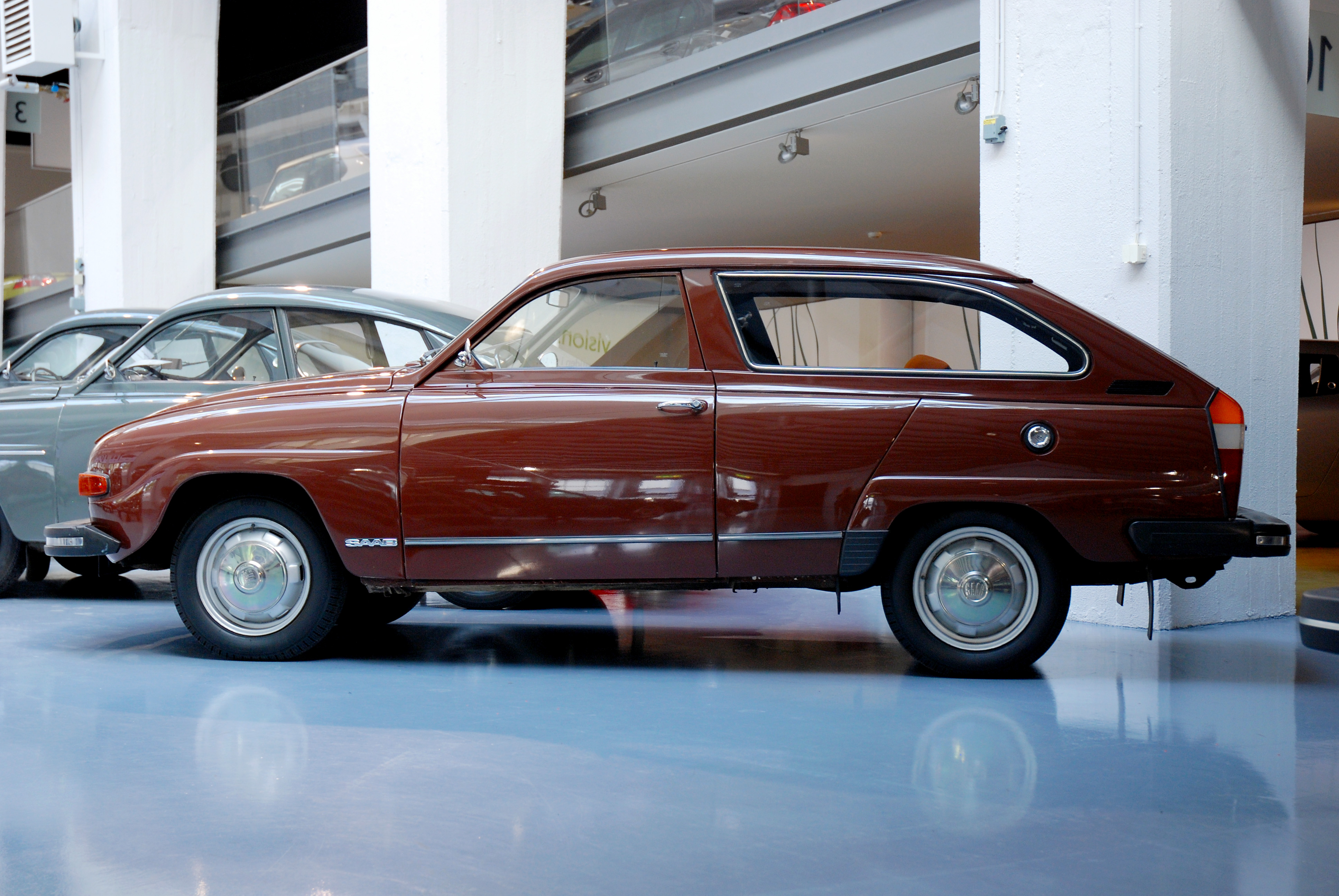
Side view

Only a handful of test cars were built up to 1976 before the project was abandoned when Saab decided there was no room in the market for a car between the Saab 95 and Saab 99.

The only surviving 98, licence plate (Swedish) AYX 330, started its life as a white Saab 95 registered on 7 September 1973. It is currently painted 'Siena Brown' and on display in the Saab Museum in Trollhättan.
