= Combi coupé =

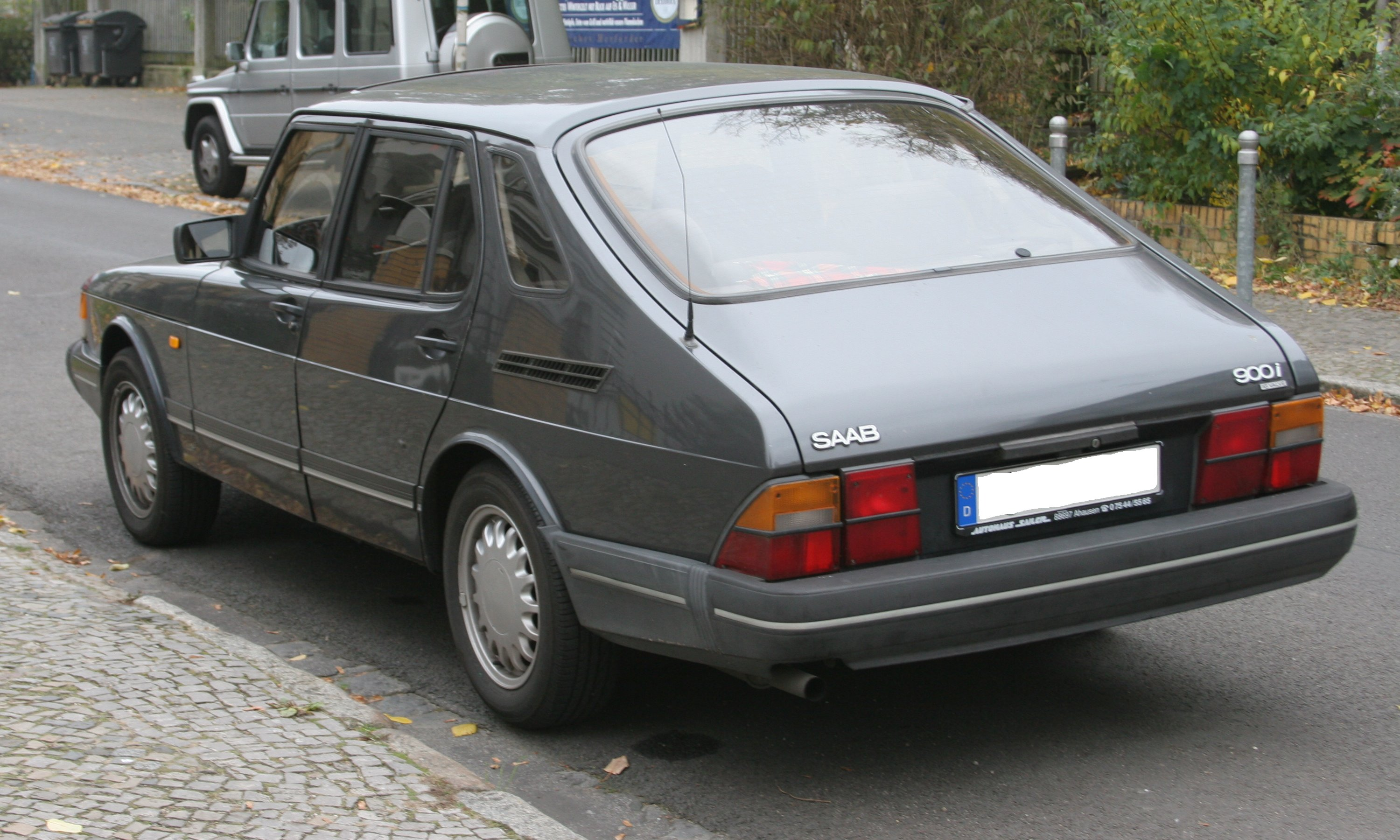
Saab 900

Combi coupé is a marketing term used by Saab to describe cars with a sloping coupé-like rear hatchback. The term joins the European term "combi" (for an estate car / station wagon) with coupé.

The design combines the functionality of a hatchback with the appearance of a fastback (as in liftback). As per a hatchback, the combi coupé incorporates a shared passenger and cargo space.

== Origin ==
The term was coined by Björn Envall and first introduced with the 1974 Saab 99. Saab also discussed making a hatchback available for the Saab 96/Saab 95 model range and Envall created the prototype Saab 98. The "Combi coupé" term was later applied to the Saab 900 model line-up.

Volvo also made a prototype combi coupé. Similar automobiles from other manufacturers were marketed as liftbacks.

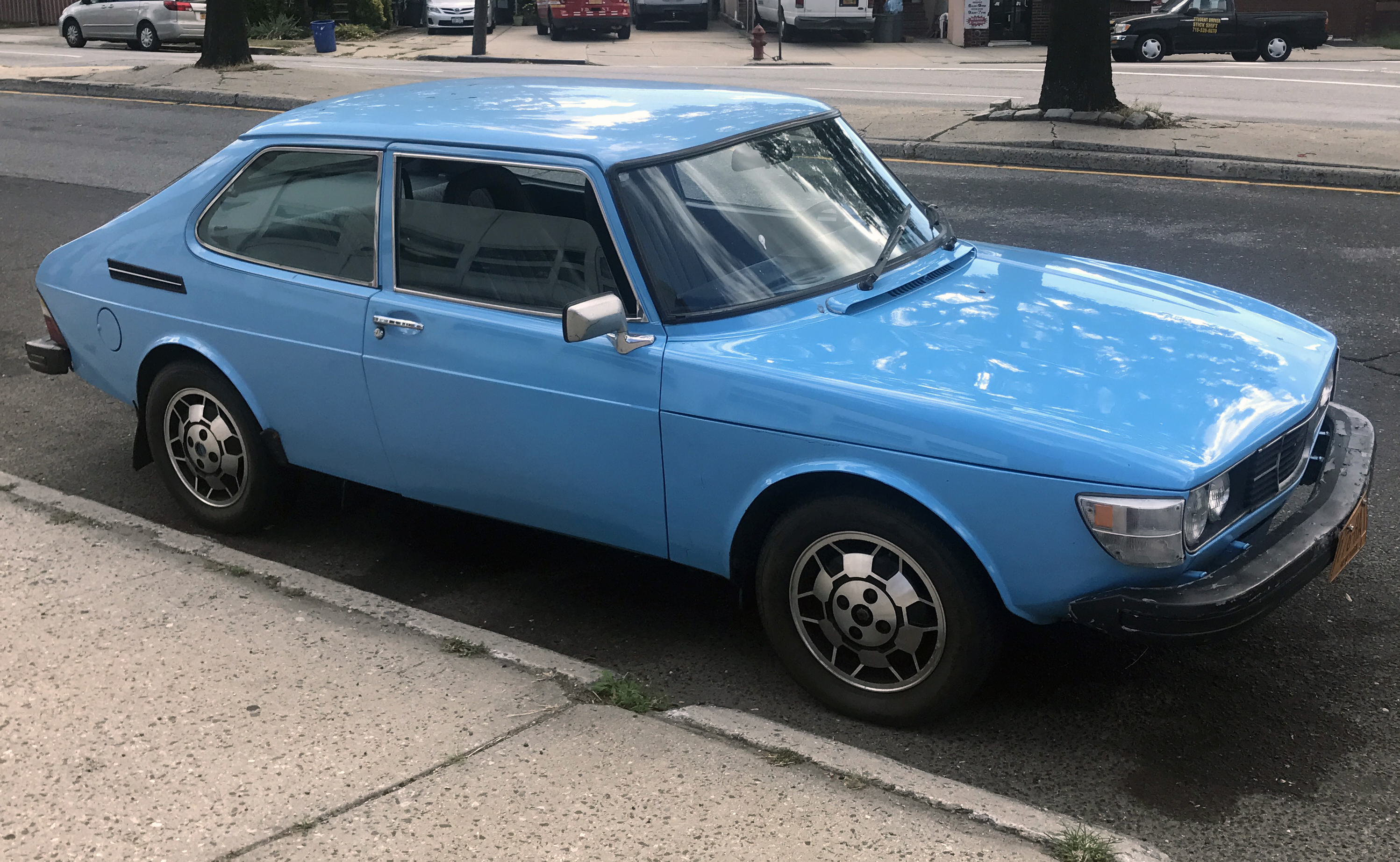
Saab 99 - front

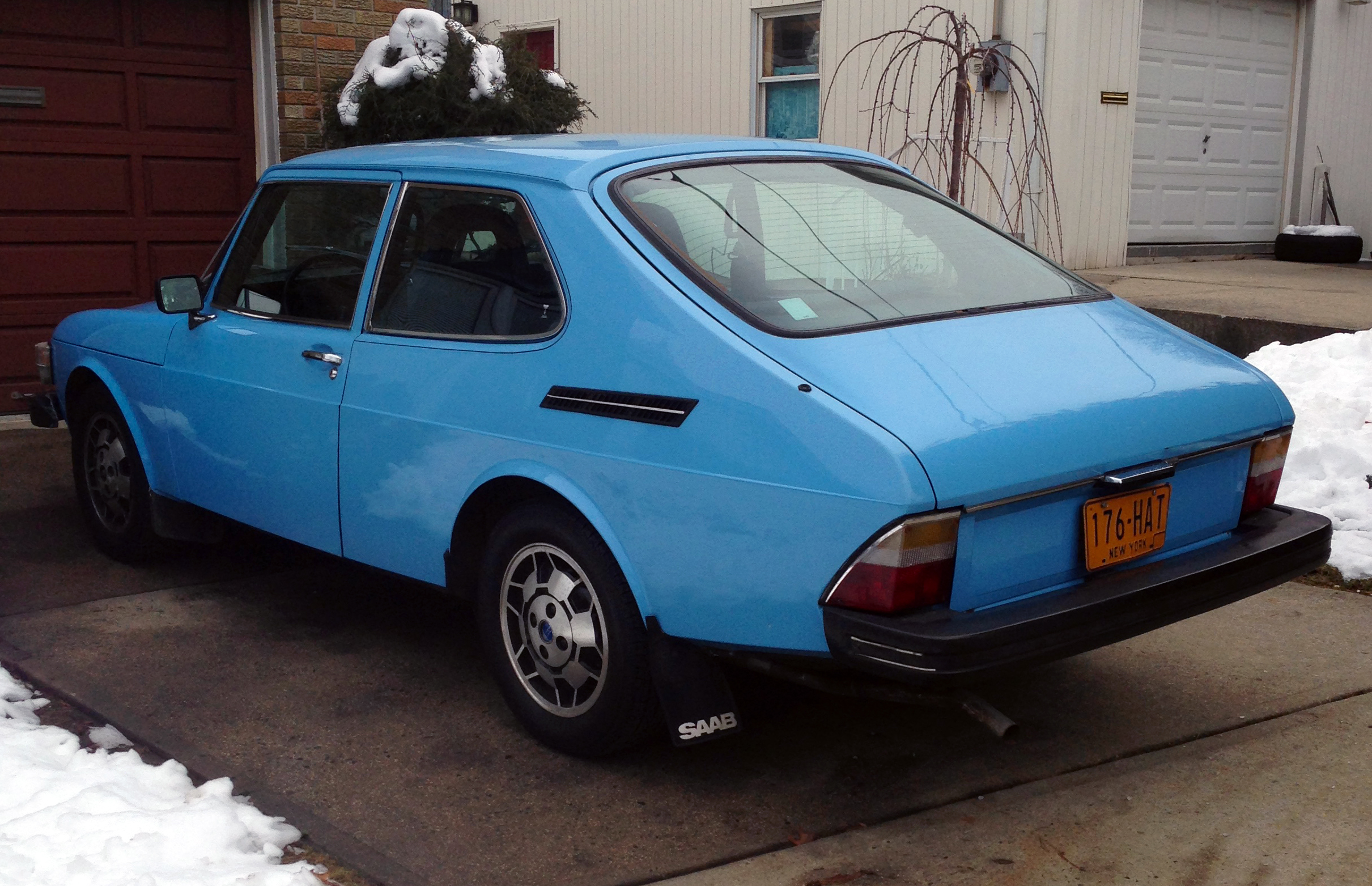
Saab 99 - rear

== Modern examples ==
At the 2010 Paris Motor Show, Saab showed models that indicated that the Saab 9-3 would be available as a combi coupé. It was since then confirmed that the 9-3 would be available as a combi coupé, convertible and crossover.
