= Björn Envall =

Swedish automobile designer (born 1942)

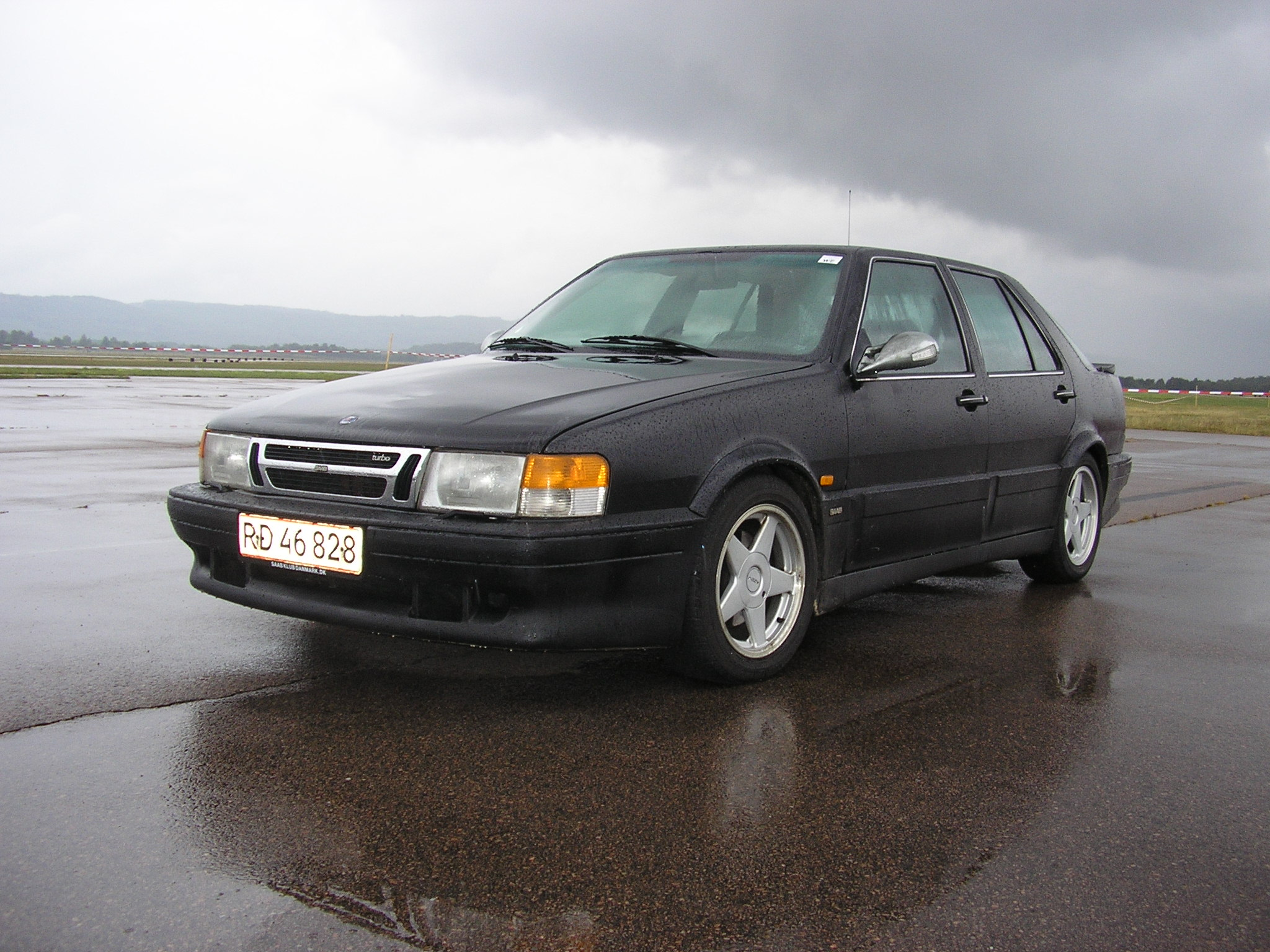

Björn Erik Anders Envall (born 1942), is a Swedish retired automobile designer. He was head of the design department at Saab.

He started his career in the 1960s at Saab as an apprentice under Sixten Sason, especially helping with the design of the Saab 99 and the ill-fated Saab Catherina sports car. In fact, after the failure of that design to be accepted by Saab, he designed (on paper only) a further and progressive two-seater, which was never built.

During the 1970s, Saab, under Envall's leadership, created the Combi coupé version of the Saab 99, which in 1978 became the Saab 900. Within the framework of the Club of Four collaboration, Giorgetto Giugiaro was responsible for the main design, while Björn Envall "saabified" the Fiat Croma/Lancia Thema.

After a two years spell at Opel he took over Sason's work at Saab, in 1969, following Sason's death. He held this position until 1992. Among his designs there was the Saab EV-1, Saab 98, the Saab 99 Combi Coupé, the Saab 900 and the Saab 900 convertible. He also guided the co-operation project with Fiat, that led to the Saab 9000. He made the original drawings of the 'new generation' Saab 900, in 1988, before the involvement of General Motors in the company.
