= Saab MFI13 =

Automobile prototype

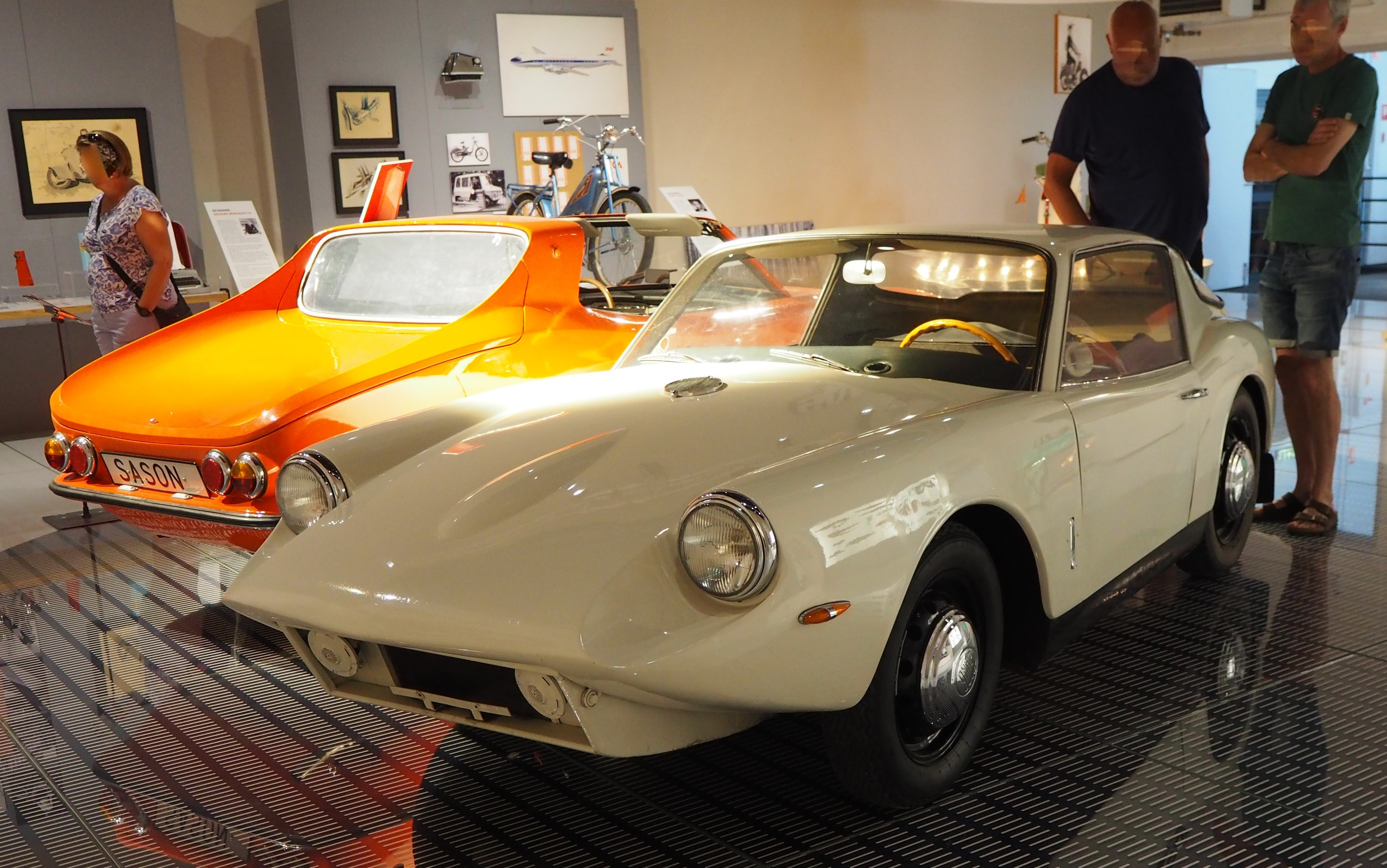

Overview
- Manufacturer: Saab Automobile

Body and chassis
- Body style: Coupe

The Saab MFI 13 was a February 1965 prototype for the Saab 97 automobile, later known as Sonett II. It was built at the Malmö Flygindustri as they had some experience with plastic manufacturing. The body of the prototype was made of steel though. A second prototype was designed by Sixten Sason and delivered a month later by ASJ (Aktiebolaget Svenska Järnvägsverkstäderna - the Swedish Railroad Works) in Arlöv.

Both cars were brought to Trollhättan for examination and the MFI car was determined to be the most suitable for further development. Both cars had the two stroke Saab Sport engine of 60 hp (45 kW) and were capable of 160 km/h. By spring 1966 the project 97 had advanced enough so that 24 cars could be built in Arlöv, in the south of Sweden. When series production started by the end of the year, many details had been altered: brakes, ventilation system, grille and parking lights. Prototypes were shown at both the Salon International de l'Auto (Geneva) and New York International Auto Show. In Geneva a car was available for test driving.

Both cars are now on display in the Saab Museum in Trollhättan.

== See also ==
- Saab Catherina

== Sources ==
- The SAAB Way, by Gunnar A. Sjögren.
