= Saab Sonett =

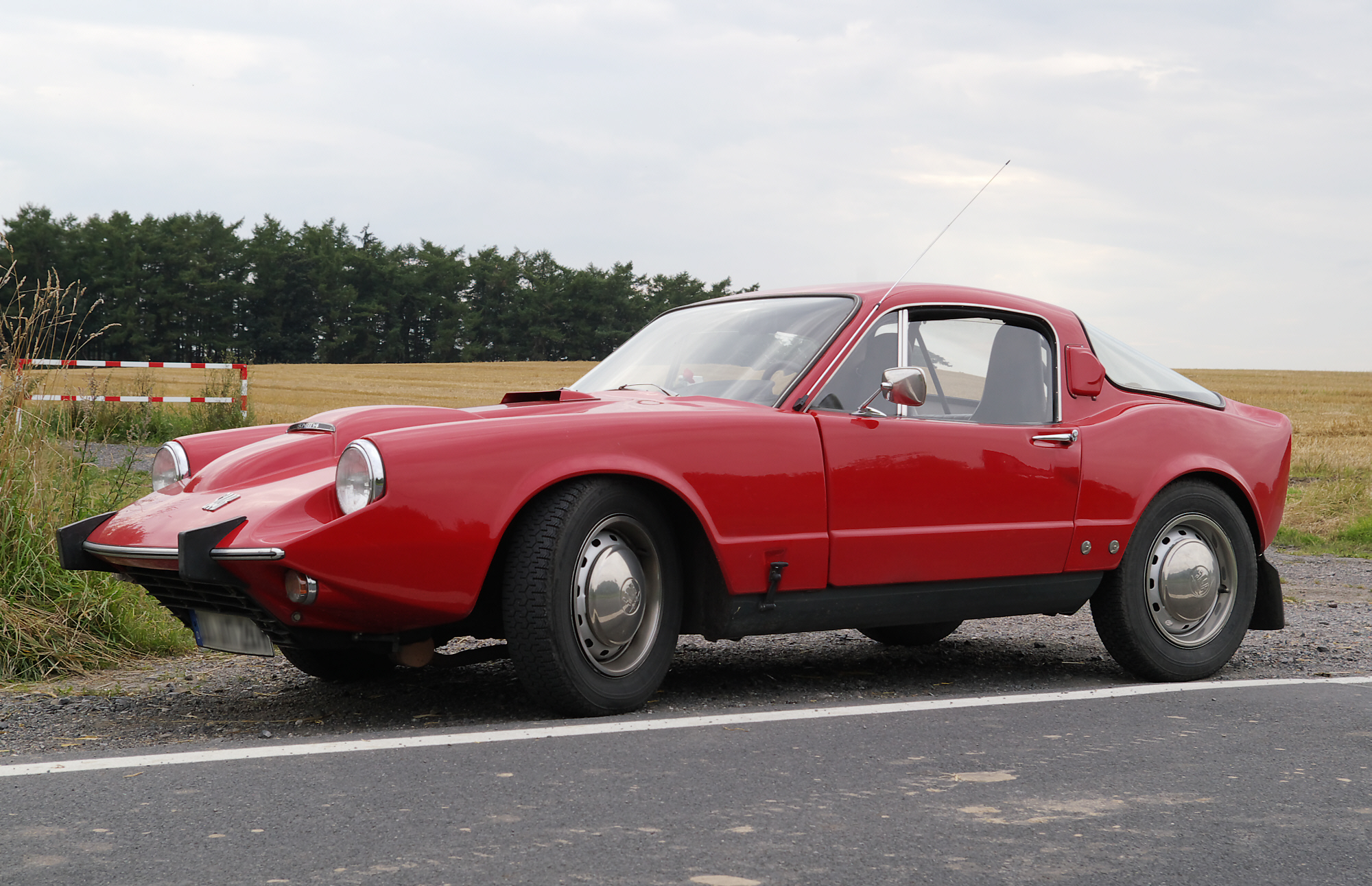
- Sonett V4

Overview
- Manufacturer: Saab Automobile
- Production: 1955–1957 (Series I); 1966–1974 (Series II and III)
- Assembly: Sweden: Trollhättan; Arlöv

Body and chassis
- Body style: 2-door roadster; 2-door coupé
- Related: Saab 93; Saab 96

The Saab Sonett is an automobile manufactured by Swedish automaker Saab between 1955 and 1957 and again between 1966 and 1974. The Sonett share its engines and other mechanical components with the Saab 93, 95 and 96 of the same era. It was mainly intended for the lucrative American export market and was only offered intermittently in the Swedish domestic market for the 1968 and 1972 model years.

The first prototype, now known as the Sonett I, is a two-seat, open-top, lightweight roadster racer. Ten years later, the name was revived for the commercially distributed Sonett models II, V4, and III.

== Sonett I ==
Sonett I
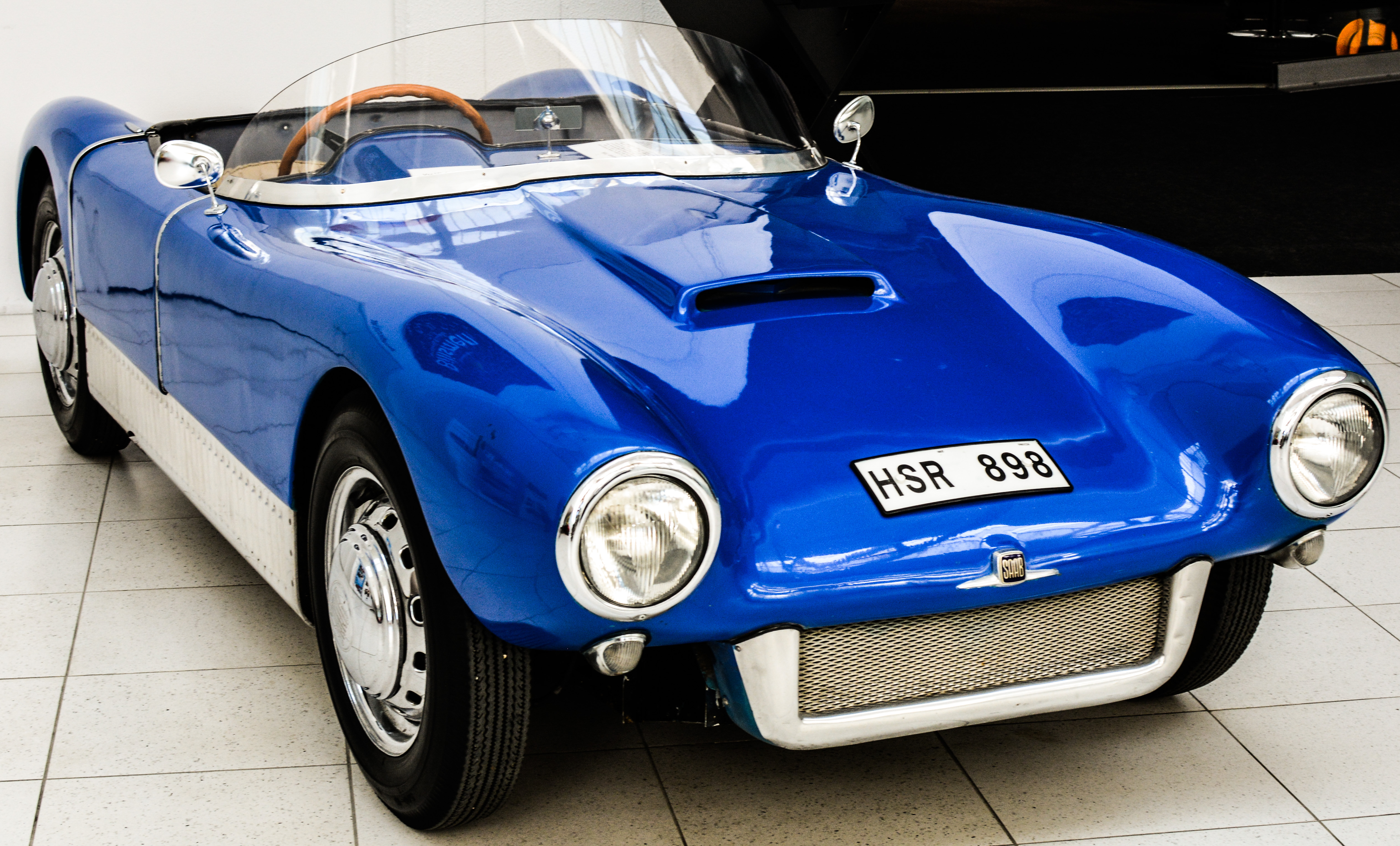

Overview
- Also called: Saab 94; Super Sport Prototype; Model 94
- Production: 1955–1957
- Designer: Sixten Sason

Body and chassis
- Body style: 2-door roadster
- Layout: Front-mid-engine, front-wheel-drive

Powertrain
- Engine: 0.8 L (750 cc) Saab 2-stroke I3
- Transmission: 4-speed manual

Dimensions
- Length: 3,485 mm (137.2 in)
- Width: 1,420 mm (55.9 in)
- Curb weight: 500 kg (1,102 lb)

In the 1950s, Rolf Mellde—a Saab engine developer and race enthusiast—along with Lars Olov Olsson, Olle Lindkvist, and Gotta Svensson, designed a two-seat roadster prototype in a barn in Åsaka, near Trollhättan (the site of the main Saab manufacturing facility). The limited research-and-development project, with a total budget of only 75,000 Swedish kronor, first came to be known as the Saab 94 but was later renamed as the Sonett, a name derived from the Swedish phrase Så nätt den är ("how neat it is", or more literally "it's so neat") by the car's designer Sixten Sason. This name was initially rejected by Saab's management but was eventually accepted in October 1955 when the first prototype was completed. The Sonett shares a lot of components from the 93 Saloon such as the front suspension, engine and gearbox. The engine and gearbox were rotated 180-degrees and fitted behind the front axle. This required reversing the engine's direction of rotation which was easily achieved due to the engine being a 2-stroke unit.

In order to avoid using a tubular frame chassis used by other low volume sports cars at the time, Mellde instead decided to use an advanced stressed skin-lightweight aluminium chassis that weighed less than 70 kg (154 lb). The metal sections of the chassis were riveted together, a concept used in aircraft manufacturing, while the mechanical components such as the engine, fuel tank, axles and body work were mounted directly onto the chassis. Mellde and Sason decided to use glass-reinforced plastic for the construction of the car's body, a material which was becoming more popular for automotive use at the time. In order to manufacture the body of the car from this material, Soab, a company specializing in plastics imported from the United States based in Gothenburg was hired to make the lightweight body shell.

The Sonett was introduced on 16 March 1956 at Stockholm's Bilsalong (motor show). Featuring a three-cylinder 748 cc two-stroke engine generating 57.5 PS (42 kW), the Sonett I was an advanced low-weight 600 kg (1,323 lb) racer based on aircraft design concepts.

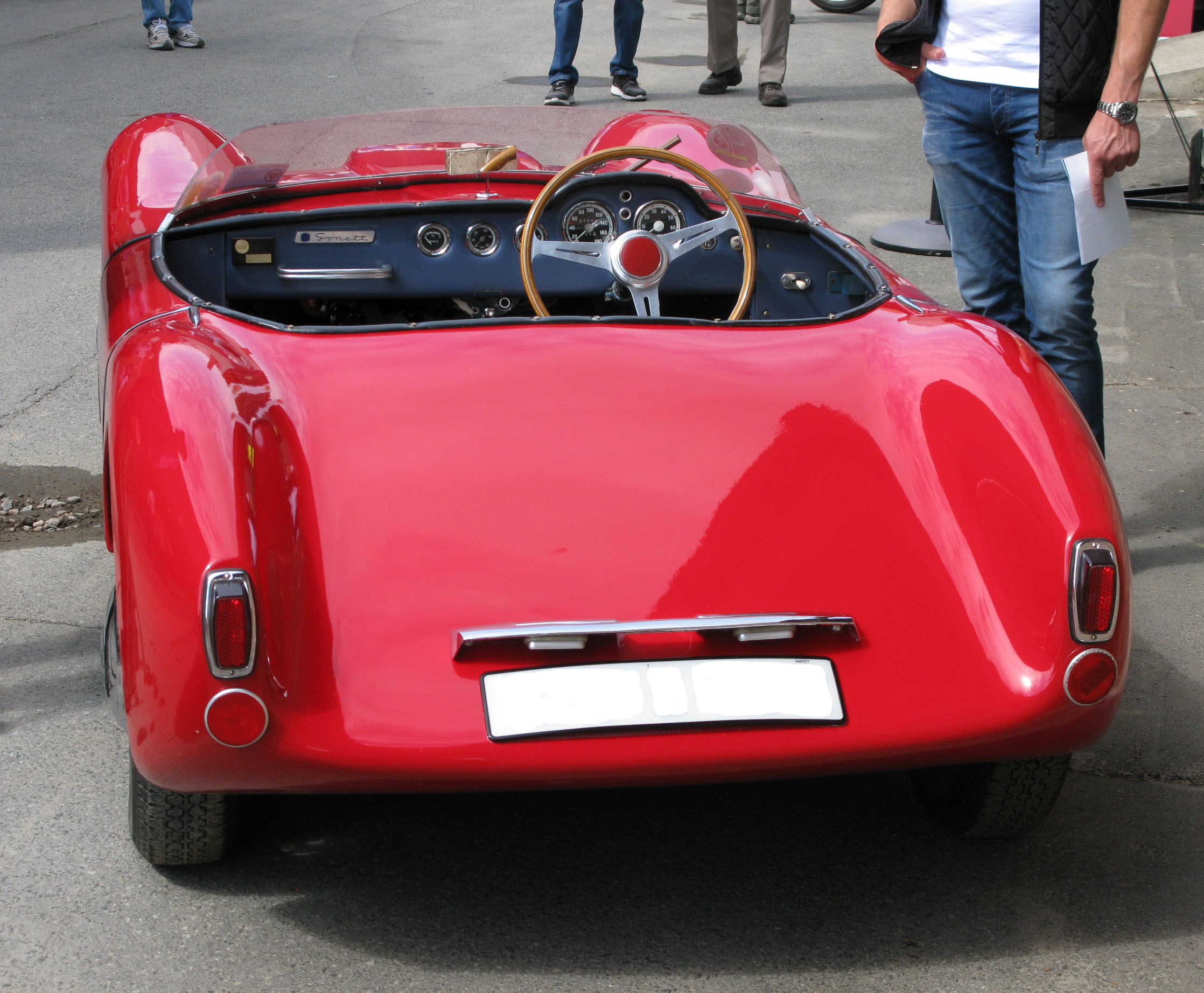
Saab Sonett I, rear view

With a projected top speed of 190 km/h (120 mph), the Sonett I had the prospect of success on the European race circuit, and a production run of 2,000 units was planned for 1957. However, the competition rules changed, permitting modified production cars into the race classes which Saab had envisioned for its purpose-built Sonett, and the economic and marketing viability of the project faded.

Only six cars were made between 1955 and early 1957, all right-hand drive units. The decision to build the Sonett 1 was reversed by the Saab management in early 1958 who decided to build a performance-oriented variant of the 93 Saloon called the GT 750. The original prototype, known as "No. 1" and built with a manually crafted glass-reinforced plastic (GRP, or "fiberglass") body, served as the reference model for the other five cars. An extremely rare vehicle, only two cars exist in the United States. Chassis number 2 was in the GM Heritage Center Collection but it was sold to Saab Cars North America (SCNA) after GM's 2009 bankruptcy. After Saab, too, went bankrupt in 2012, it was sold on to the Saab Heritage Car Museum USA in South Dakota.

In September 1996, rally driver Erik Carlsson broke the Swedish record for the under–750-cc engine class with a speed of 159.4 km/h (99.0 mph) in the restored Sonett I prototype "No. 1".

== Sonett II ==
Sonett II and V4
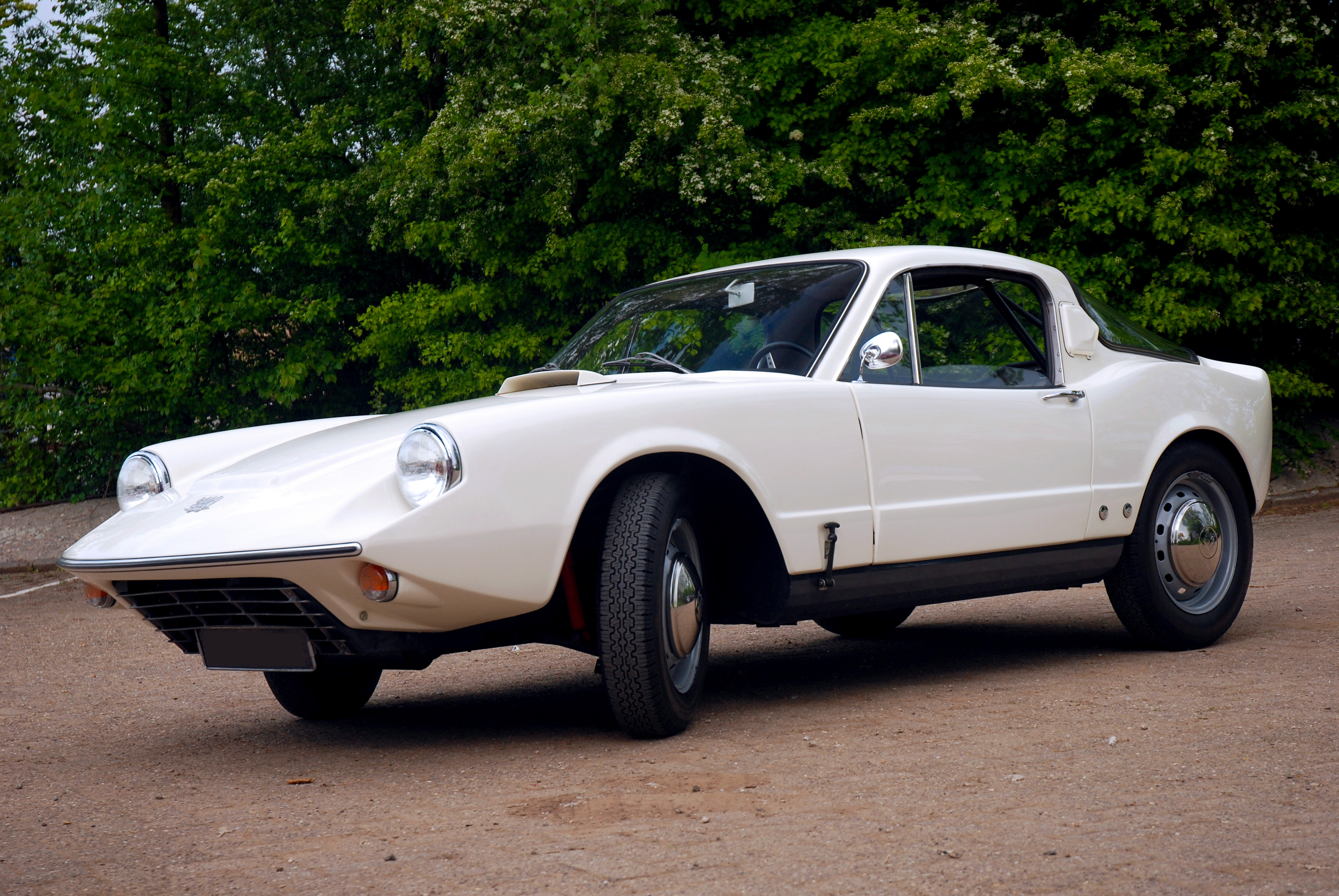
- Sonett II (1966)

Overview
- Also called: Saab 97
- Production: 1966–1969
- Designer: Björn Karlström

Body and chassis
- Body style: 2-door coupé
- Layout: Front-engine, front-wheel-drive
- Related: ÚVMV 1100 GT; Saab 95; Saab 96; Saab Granturismo

Powertrain
- Engine: 0.8 L (841 cc) Saab two-stroke I3; 1.5 L (1,498 cc) Ford Taunus V4
- Transmission: 4-speed manual

Dimensions
- Wheelbase: 2,159 mm (85 in)
- Height: 1,219 mm (48 in)
- Curb weight: 710 kg (1,565 lb)

In the early 1960s, Saab's North American dealers managed to convince its management that a sports car would be a right choice to appeal to the US market as European sports cars, especially those from MG and Triumph were a huge success. The demands from the dealers included a targa top roof, wind-up windows, a heater as standard equipment and good handling. Saab decided to outsource the development of the project and two concept cars were built, the Saab MFI13 by Malmö Flygindustri which was designed by Björn Karlström, an aircraft and automotive illustrator, and Walter Kern, an engineer at Massachusetts Institute of Technology, and the Saab Catherina by Sixten Sason in his private design studio. The management ultimately accepted the MFI13 design proposal.

After some modifications, such as the adoption of a sheet metal box-frame chassis, the MFI13 was unveiled first at the 1966 New York Auto Show and the Geneva Motor Show. was put into limited production in 1966 as the Sonett II, manufactured at the Aktiebolaget Svenska Järnvägsverkstäderna (ASJ) in Arlöv. Inside Saab, it was designated model 97. A further 230 units were assembled in 1967, but as the two-stroke engine became increasingly uncompetitive in the US market due to emissions regulations, a switch to the Ford Taunus V4 engine was made in the middle of the 1967 production year, and the model was renamed the Sonett V4. Apart from the engine and related drivetrain, the Sonett II and Sonett V4 share much of their componentry and are distinguished from each other by a buldge on the hood of the V4, in order to accommodate the larger and taller engine. The additional weight did require some strengthening of the chassis and suspension pieces, and the wheels were half an inch wider than the four-inch units used on the Sonett II. The 1967 year holds the distinction of becoming the last 2 stroke engine passenger automobile sold new in the United States.

Like the Sonett I prototype, the Sonett II's fiberglass body was bolted to a box-type chassis with an added roll-bar to support the hard top. The entire front hood section hinged forward to allow easy access to the engine, transmission, and front suspension. Equipped with a three-cylinder, two-stroke engine generating 60 PS (44 kW; 59 hp), the Sonett II achieved 0 to 100 km/h (0–62 mph) time of 12.5 seconds, with a top speed of 150 km/h (93 mph). All Sonett IIs were left hand drive (LHD).

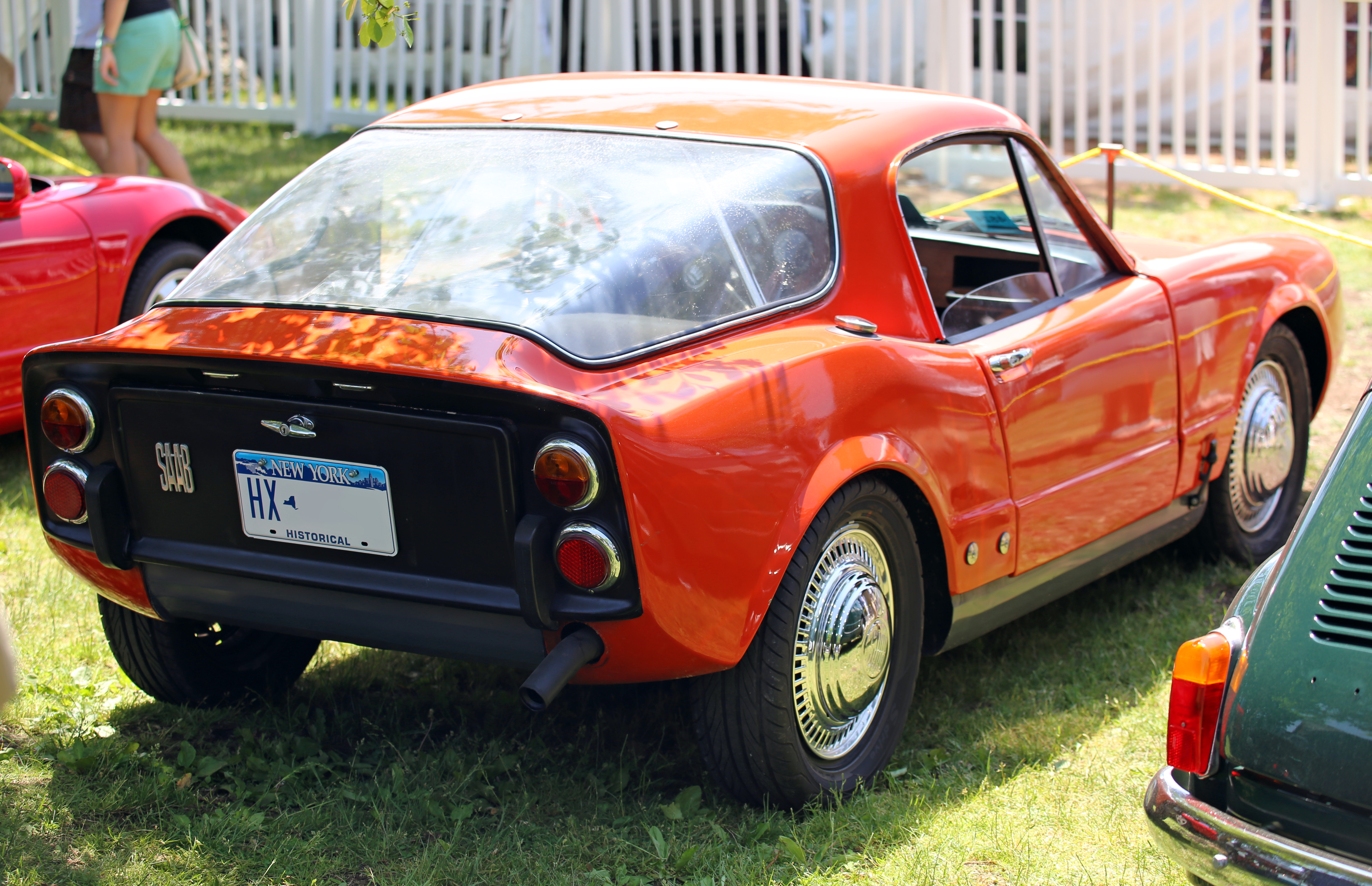
The rear of a 1966 two-stroke Sonett II

Designed as a race car, the Sonett II competed successfully against other small European sports cars, including the Austin-Healey Sprite and Triumph Spitfire, in Sports Car Club of America (SCCA) races of the period. Due to low production volume, it was disqualified from certain competitions. By 1967, the two-stroke engine failed to meet US emission control standards. In 2011 a two-stroke Sonett II achieved 109 mph (175 km/h) at the Bonneville Salt Flats. Of the 28 Sonett IIs manufactured in 1966 all were equipped with 841 cc three cylinder two-stroke engines. SAAB produced serial numbers 29 through 258 with the two-stroke engine, serial number 259 was the first Sonett to have the V4 engine.

All Sonett II transmissions had a freewheel that could be engaged and disengaged while in motion via a pull handle down near the throttle pedal. The freewheel was required in the normal (non-oil pump engines) SAAB two stroke engines but not in the racing engines that had an oil injection system fed from a supply tank, nor in the Sonett V4 since it had a four-stroke engine with the common recirculating pressure lubrication.

The Škoda-engined ÚVMV 1100 GT was based on the Sonett II.

=== Sonett V4 ===
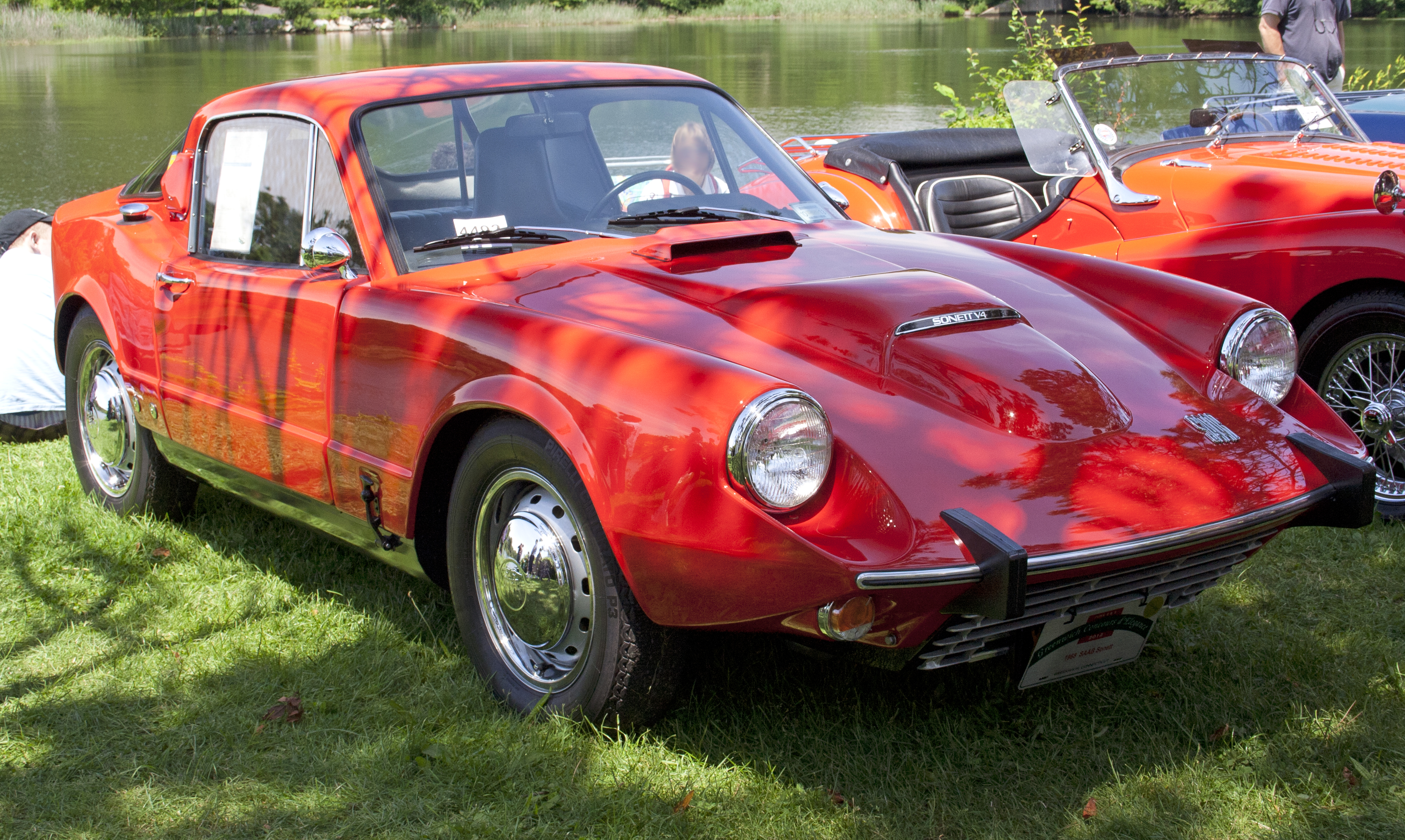
1968 SAAB Sonett V4

When Saab started using the Ford Taunus V4 engine in their 95, 96, and Monte Carlo models, an upgrade for the low-volume Sonett II became economically feasible. The Sonett V4 was introduced with a 1.5 L (1,498 cc) Ford V4 engine in the middle of the 1967 model year starting with serial number 259. A new "bulge" hood, designed by Gunnar A. Sjögren, was required to clear the larger V4 engine, with a slight right offset to avoid obstructing the driver's view. This asymmetrical hood shape, criticized by both the automotive press and within Saab itself, contributed to the motivation for the 1970 Sonett III redesign.

The Ford V4 engine produced 65 hp (48 kW), and—combined with the car's lightweight chassis and fiberglass construction—allowed the V4 model to accelerate from 0 to 100 km/h (0 to 62 mph) in 12.5 seconds, with a top speed of 160 km/h (99 mph). The V4's dashboard was wrinkle finished black, unlike the wooden panel used in the Sonett II.

Following the low-volume 1966–67 Sonett IIs, Saab ramped up Sonett V4 production to meet minimum SCCA requirements, assembling 70 units in the 1967 transition year, 900 units in 1968, and 640 units in the final 1969 production year—a total of 1,610 cars. The 1969 models can be recognized by their taller seat backs and by having a lid for the glove compartment, while the heater was also made somewhat more efficient.

While the Sonett V4 was assembled in Sweden, nearly the entire production was exported to the United States, with an MSRP of between US$3,200 and US$3,800 (US$28,094 to US$33,362 in today's dollars). In addition to its unusual fiberglass body, the Sonett V4 featured advanced safety features for its day, including a roll bar, three-point seat belts, and high-back bucket seats to protect against whiplash injury. Sonett V4s also sported a few oddities compared to standard American sports cars like e.g. Corvette, such as front wheel drive; a freewheeling clutch that disengaged automatically whenever the accelerator pedal was no longer pressed, and a column-mounted shifter, rather than a typical floor-mounted shifter.

In spite of lackluster Saab marketing, unusual features, and quirky design, the Sonett V4 found a niche market in the US, propelled by successful SCCA racing performances of the Sonett II. Its primary competitors were British roadsters, including the MG Midget and MG MGB, the Triumph TR5, the TVR Grantura and the Austin-Healey Sprite Mark IV.

The Clean Air Act of 1970 prompted engineering modifications to the Ford V4 emission control system that were difficult to reconcile with the Sonett II/V4 body style which then led to the Sonett III redesign.

== Sonett III ==
Saab Sonett III
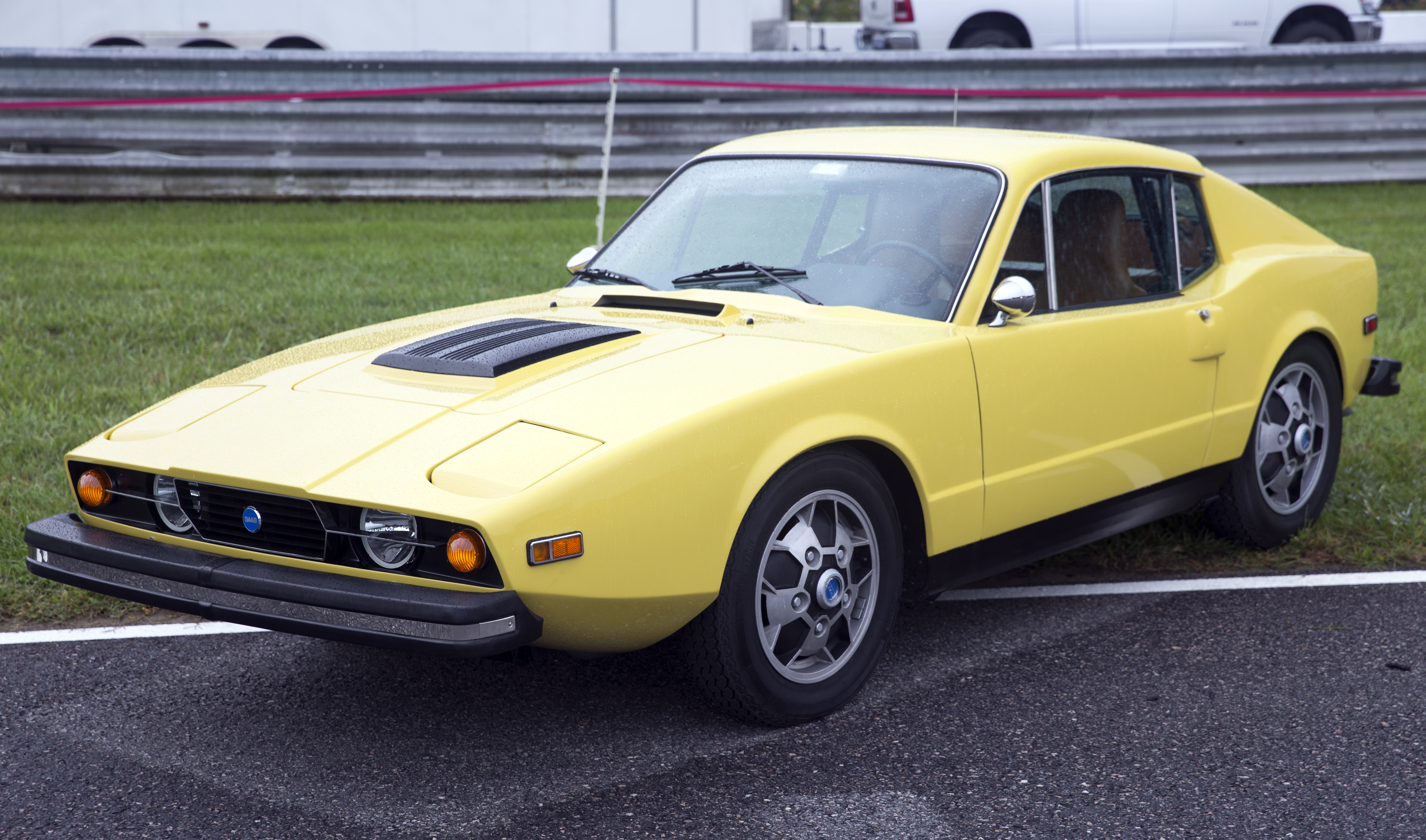

Overview
- Also called: Saab 97
- Production: 1970–1974
- Designer: Sergio Coggiola; Gunnar A. Sjögren

Body and chassis
- Body style: 2-door coupé
- Layout: Front-engine, front-wheel-drive
- Related: Saab Sonett II

Powertrain
- Engine: 1,500–1,700 cc (1.5–1.7 L) Ford Taunus V4
- Transmission: 4-speed manual

Dimensions
- Wheelbase: 2,150 mm (84.6 in)
- Length: 3,900 mm (153.5 in)
- Width: 1,500 mm (59.1 in)
- Curb weight: 880 kg (1,940 lb)

The 1970 redesign of the Sonett V4, named the Sonett III, was initially given to the Italian automobile designer Sergio Coggiola in order to make the car look more appealing as the Sonett II had faced major criticism for its design. However, Saab tasked its own designer, Gunnar A. Sjögren in order to make the car fit the existing Sonett II chassis without the expensive manufacturing-line changes. A hinged rear-window glass replaced the Sonett II/V4 rear compartment hatch door. With the mandate for a "bulge-less" hood, the engine compartment opening evolved into a small front popup panel, resulting in more limited access than in the Sonett V4. Extensive engine work required the removal of the entire front hood section.

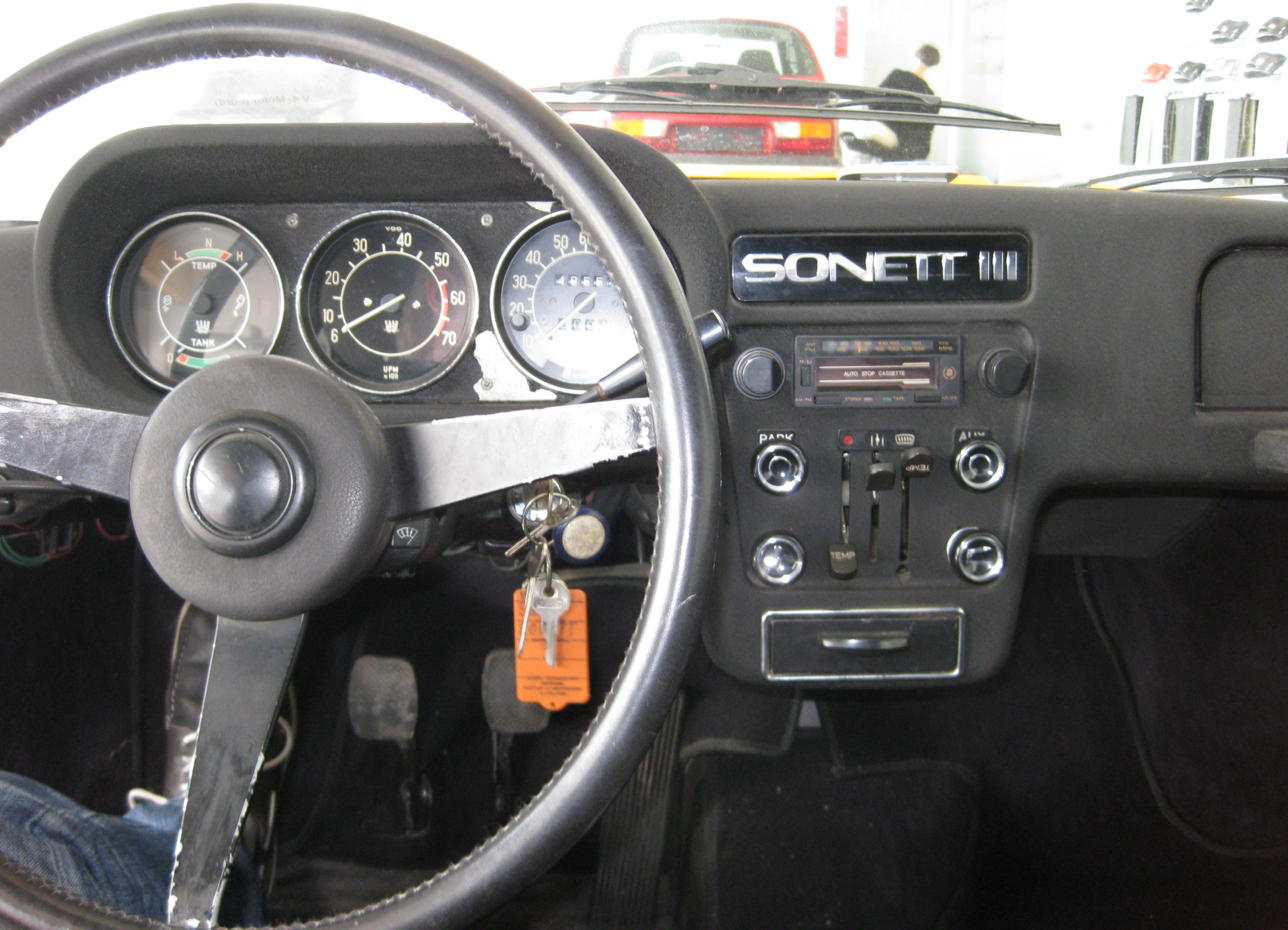
1972 Saab Sonett III dashboard

To help adapt the car to US market tastes, the Sonett III featured a floor-mounted shifter (instead of the Sonett V4's column-mounted shifter) and optional dealer-installed air conditioning. The Sonett III's hidden headlamps were operated manually using a lever. US safety regulations required new low speed impact proof bumpers after 1972, significantly detracting from its Italian-inspired design. All Sonett IIIs were Left-hand drive.

While the same 1500 cc Ford Taunus V4 engine as the Sonett V4 remained available for the 1970 and 1971 model years, emission control requirements reduced the available horsepower. From 1972 to 1974, the Sonett III used the 1700 cc Ford V4, but to meet increasingly strict federal regulations, net power output remained the same as the 1500 cc engine, at 65 horsepower (48 kW). Still, the Sonett III accelerated from 0–100 km/h (0–62 mph) in 13 seconds, and—due to a higher differential gear ratio (42 teeth on the ring gear and 9 teeth on the pinion gear) than the standard 95/96 transmission (39:8)—achieved a top speed of 165 km/h (103 mph), aided by a drag coefficient of 0.31 cd.

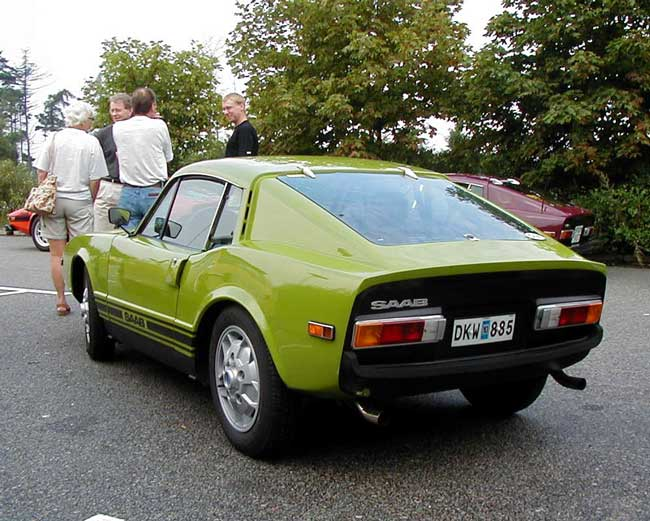
Rear view of a 1972 Saab Sonett III in green

Disappointing sales, especially during the 1973 oil crisis, led Saab to end production late in 1974. A total of 8,368 Sonett IIIs were manufactured between 1970 and 1974.

By then the production total for models Sonett II, Sonett V4 and Sonett III had reached 10,236 units.

During that time Saab USA's president Jonas Kjellberg was interested in creating a new generation of Sonett in collaboration with Reliant and styled by Tom Karen of Ogle Design, in a deal where the latter would design, engineer and assemble the car for the US market. However the project was brought to an end when the board at Saab rejected the proposals, when Kjellberg presented Reliant's business plan for the new Sonett.

SAAB also used the Sonett III for test builds powered by a Rankine cycle steam engine. One of the test cars survived and was at auction in Stockholm in July 2019.

== Cancelled PhoeniX concept ==
The Sonett name was planned to be revived as the production version of the Saab PhoeniX concept. Designed by Jason Castriota as an affordable halo car for Saab, it would have been a 2+2 sports car producing up to 400 hp in its highest form, and used the new Phoenix platform that would have underpinned the next generation 9-3 and 9-1 compact. These projects were cancelled with the dissolution of Saab in 2012.
