= ÚVMV 1100 GT =

Car model

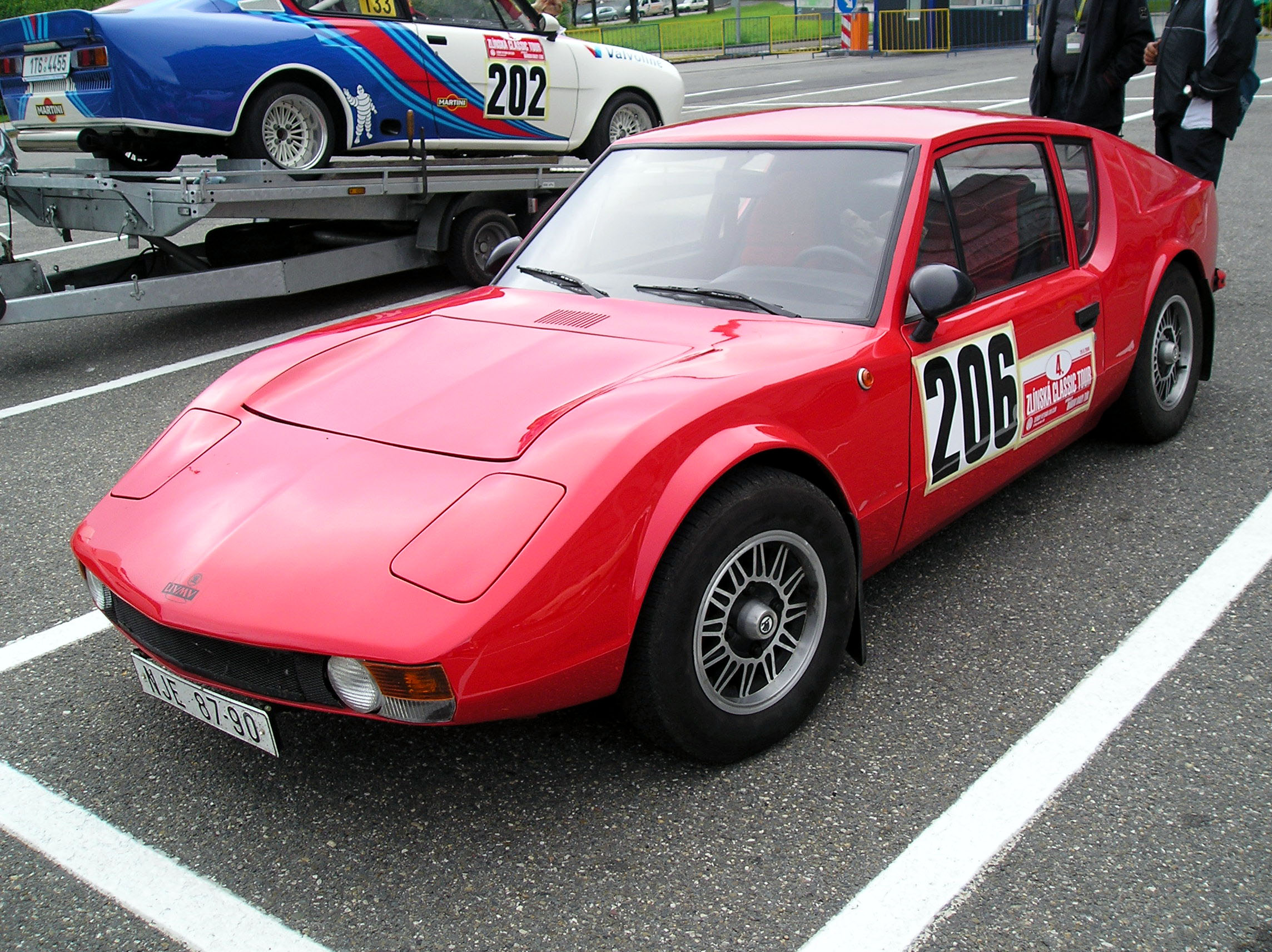
Škoda 1100 GT

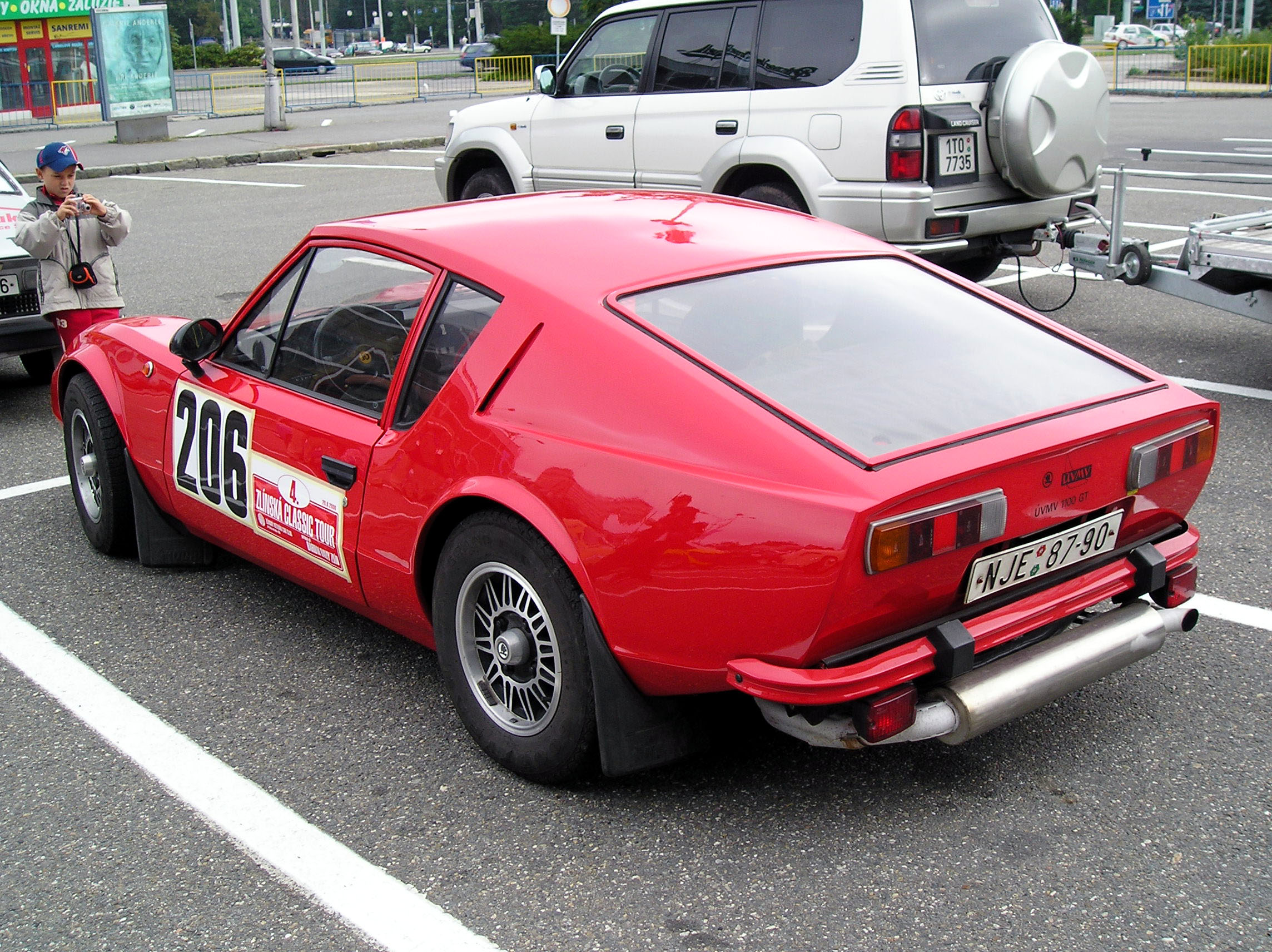
Rear

The Škoda 1100 GT (or Škoda 1100 GT) is a coupé car from AZNP made in 1970.

It was exhibited at Plzeň Expo and the next year at the Geneva Motor Show. Internal dimensions and seating position were developed from the Saab Sonett II, Glas 1300 GT and Alfa Romeo GT Junior. Unlike the Saab it used the rear-engine, rear-wheel drive layout. It was powered by a modified Škoda 110 A2 engine.

Only seven were ever built, three of them have registration numbers of the Nový Jičín District and two were variously rebuilt. It was the opponent of the Škoda 110 Super Sport Ferat.

== Specifications ==
- wheelbase: 2,200 mm (86.6 in)
- size: 3,880 mm (152.8 in) x 1,505 mm (59.3 in) x 1,125 mm (44.3 in)
- weight: 816 kg (1,799 lb)
- tyre: 14" Metzeler Monza 155 SR
- motor: modified Škoda 110 A2, dual carburettor Weber 40 DCOE2
- displacement: 1,140 cc
- max power: 55 kW (75 PS; 74 hp)
- top speed: 175 km/h (109 mph)
- 0–100 km/h (62 mph): 13.7 seconds
