= Saab EV-1 =

Car Concept Model

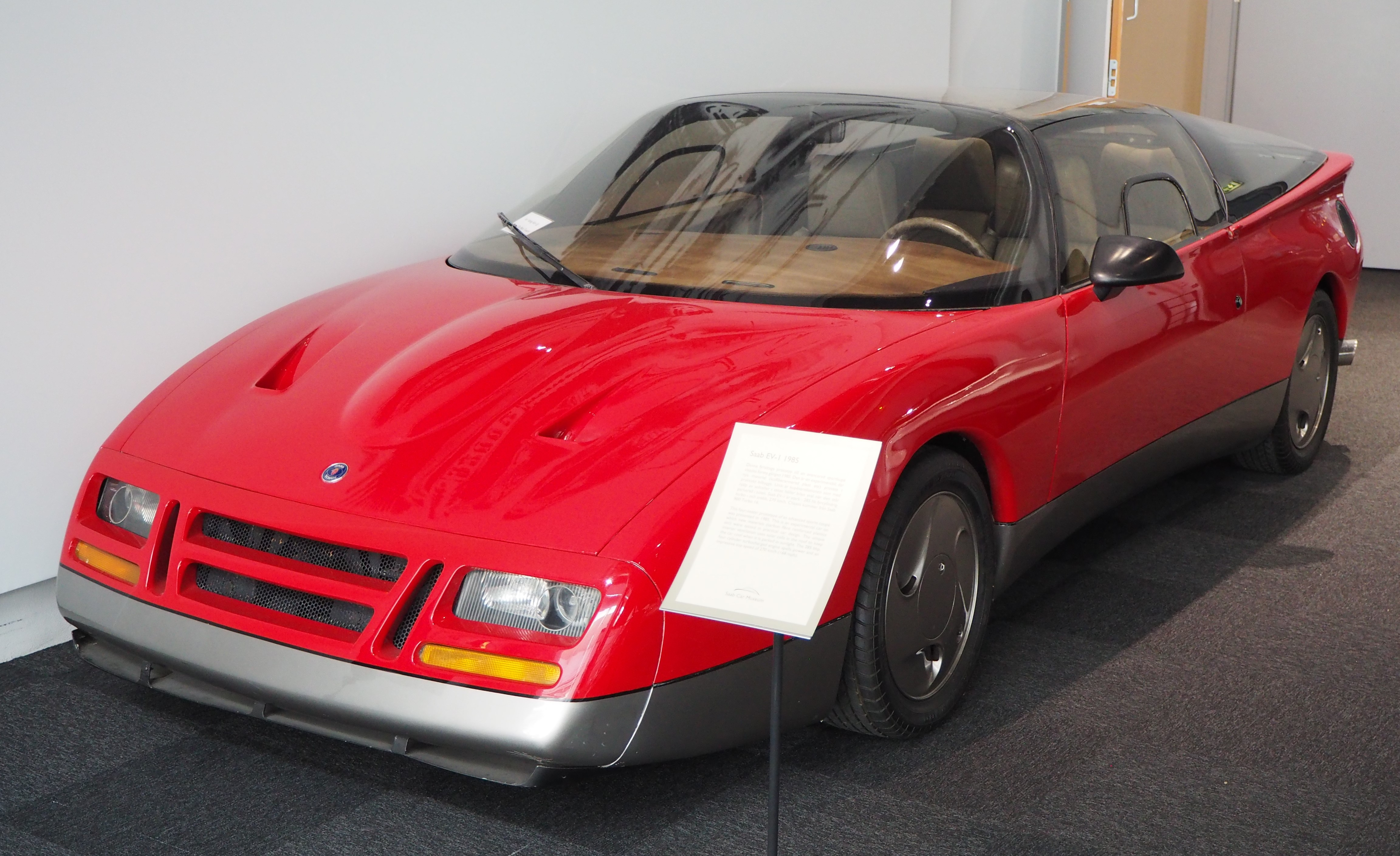
Saab EV-1

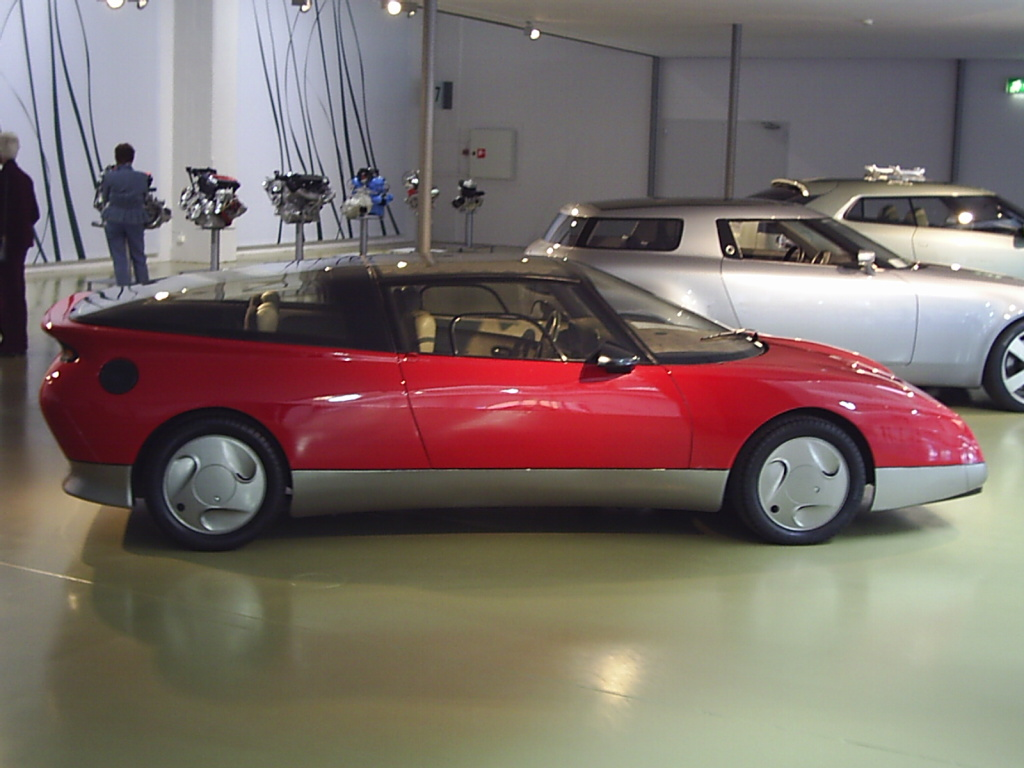
Side view

The Saab EV-1, or Saab 900 Turbo EV-1, was developed by Saab in 1985 as a fully functional and roadworthy future concept car, EV-1 stands for ´Experimental Vehicle One´.

It was a wedge shaped 2 + 2 sports coupé body style based on the Saab 900 Turbo 16v. The body was steel and the roof all glass. The design was made by Björn Envall, and the metal work was done by Leif Mellberg included features such as a solar powered interior cooling fan, with 66 solar cells mounted in the glass roof.

This device cooled the car when parked in sunlight. The front and rear bumpers (fenders) were designed to absorb impacts and revert to their original shape. They were made of Aramid fibre (Twaron or Kevlar) reinforced composites. The side doors featured carbon-fibre side impact protection.

Most of the parts were from the Saab 900 Turbo 16 and modified, but the seats came from a Chevrolet Corvette. The engine was tuned to give 285 hp (213 kW). The top speed was 270 km/h (168 mph) and 0 to 100 km/h (62 mph) acceleration took 6.9 seconds.

The speedometer lights only illuminate the area around the current speed; a modified version of this feature has been incorporated as standard on later production Saab models. The windshield is wrap around and very deep and steeply inclined for the era, while the A-pillar has a much more vertical angle, providing excellent driver visibility.

The EV-1 can be seen in the background of Back to the Future Part II.
