= Targa top =

Semi-convertible car body style

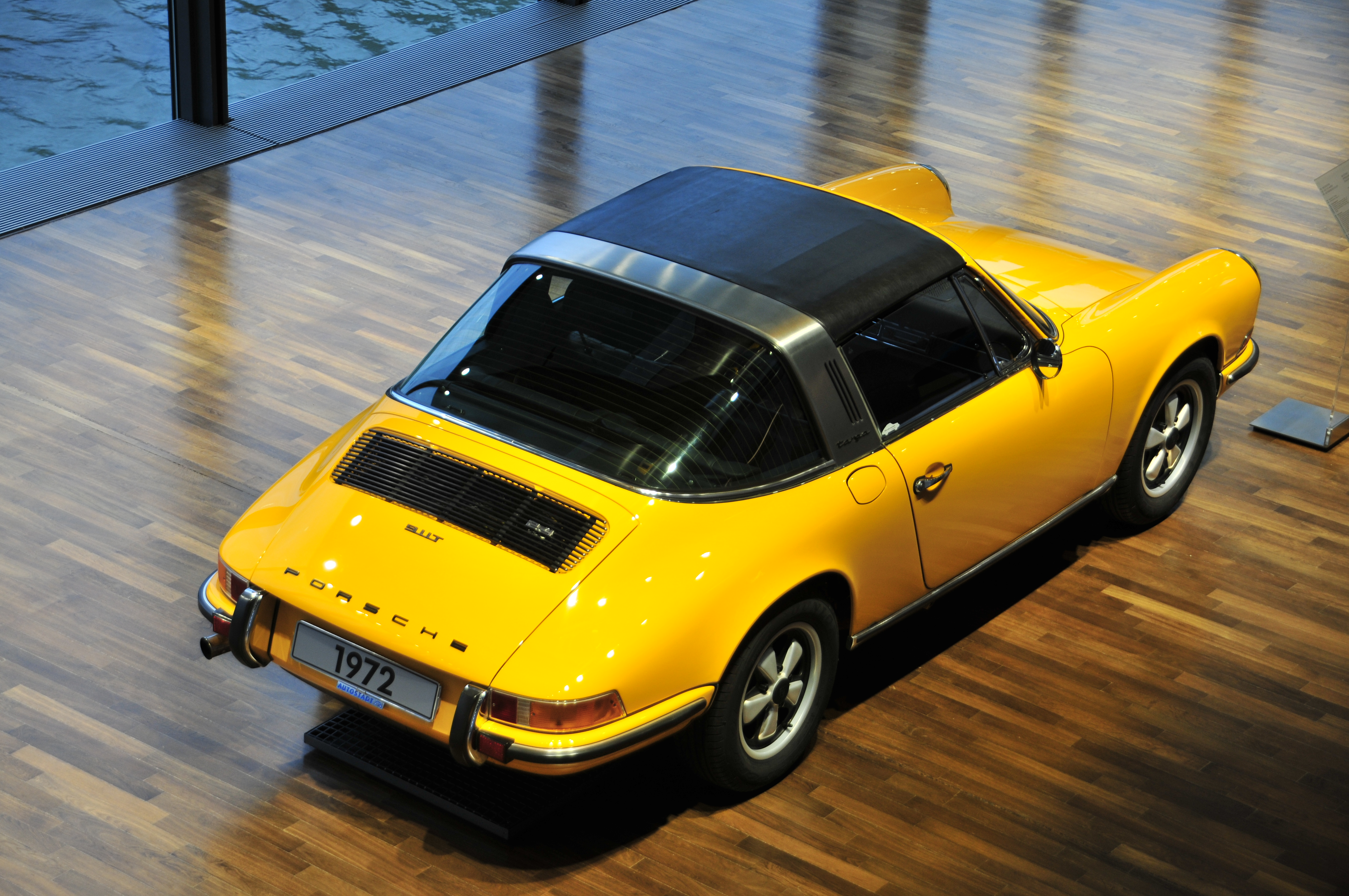
1972 Porsche 911T Targa: where the designation "Targa" appears for the first time.

Targa top, or targa for short, is a semi-convertible car body style with a removable roof section and a full-width roll bar behind the seats. The term was first used on the 1966 Porsche 911 Targa, and it remains a registered trademark of Porsche AG.

The rear window is normally fixed, but on some targa models, it is a removable plastic foldable window, making it a convertible-type vehicle. Any piece of normally fixed metal or trim, which rises up from one side, over the roof, and down the other side, is sometimes called a targa band, targa bar, or wrap-over band.

Targa tops are different from "T-tops", which have a solid, nonremovable bar running between the top of the windscreen and the rear roll bar, and generally have two separate roof panels above the seats that fit between the window and central T-bar.

== Origin ==
The word targa first came into use from the 1965 Porsche 911 Targa, though it was not the first to use the removable roof panel system. Such systems had existed since at least the 1930s on cars such as the Hispano-Suiza H6B Dubonnet Xenia. The 1957 limited-production Fiat 1200 "Wonderful" by Vignale, designed by Giovanni Michelotti, was the first known post war use of such a removable roof panel system. The later Triumph TR4 from 1961, another Michelotti design, also featured a similar system, defined by Triumph as a surrey top. The 1964 SAAB Catherina prototype and the 1965 Toyota Sports 800 both used similar systems before the 1967 Porsche 911 Targa.

The targa-style roof opening became popular in the 1960s and 1970s, when fears arose that the Department of Transportation (DOT) in the United States would ban convertibles, due to concerns over the safety of occupants when a car overturns. As a result, manufacturers adopted targa tops or T-tops. As Porsche helped to popularize this body style, they took out a trademark for the "Targa" name and manufacturers sought for alternative names for their removable tops. Porsche got the name "Targa" from the Targa Florio, the road race in Sicily, where Porsche was very successful. Targa means "plate" (or placard) in Italian.

Targa and T-top numbers have slowly declined as manufacturers discontinued them in favour of full convertibles with retractable hardtops and folding metal roofs such as the Mercedes-Benz SLK, and by better structural engineering with pop-up roll-over bars behind the seats and front roll-over bars incorporated into the front windscreen.

Targa-top body style (Fiat X1/9 example)

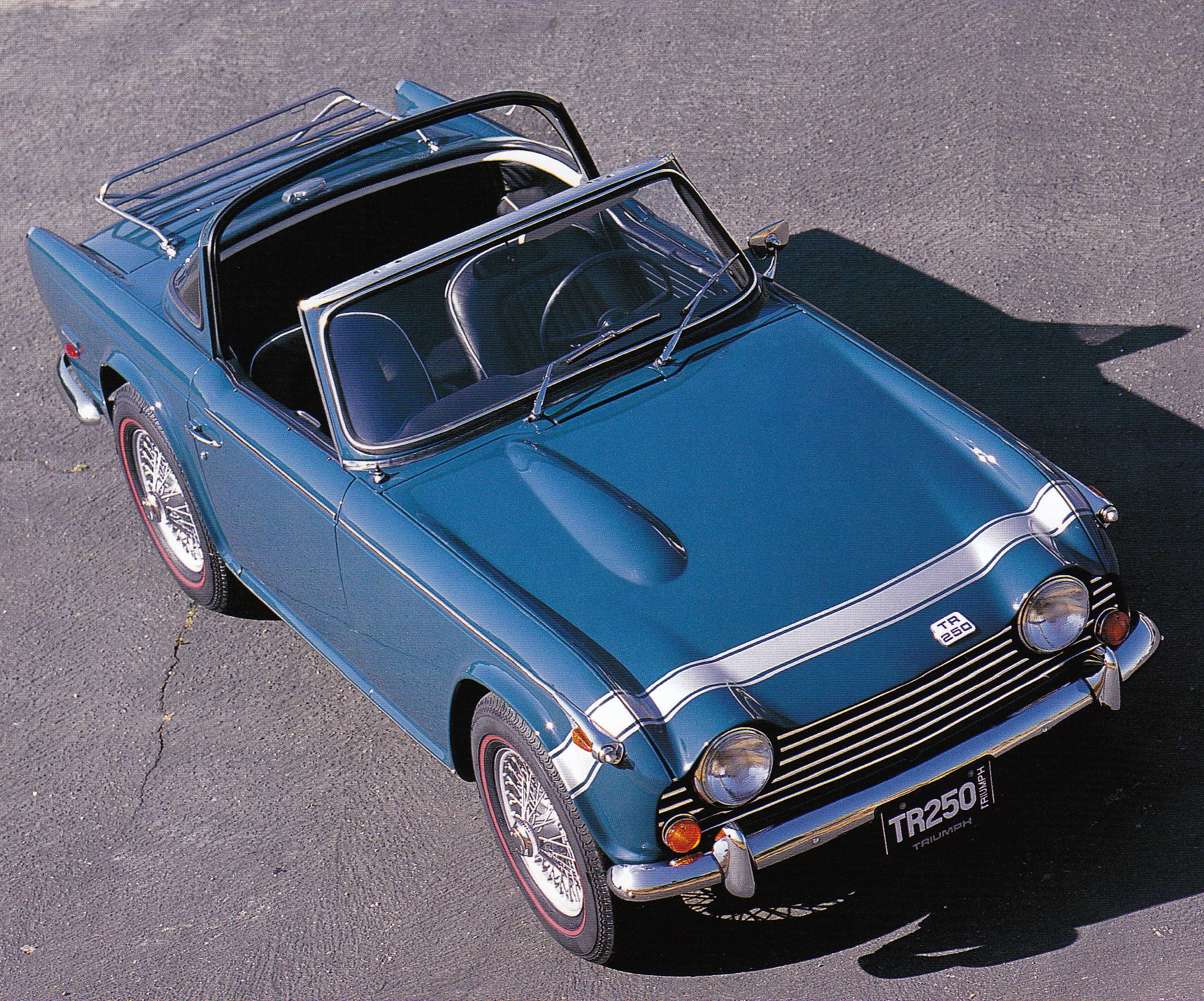
Triumph TR250 Surrey Top

== Glass roof ==
In 1996, a retractable glass roof debuted in the Porsche 993 Targa, a design continued on the 996 and 997 Targa. The glass roof retracted underneath the rear window, revealing a large opening. A shade was there to help prevent the greenhouse effect of the closed roof. This system was a complete redesign, as previous Targa models had a removable roof section and a wide B-pillar functioning as a roll bar. The new glass roof design allowed the 993 Targa to retain nearly the same side-on profile as the other 911 Carrera variants, and eliminated the inconvenience of storing the removed top of the old system. The Targa had the body of the Cabriolet with the Targa glass roof replacing the fabric roof. The 911 Targa continued with the all-new 996 model, and gained a lifting hatchback glass window. This, in turn, was used on the later 997 model of 911.

== Motorized roof ==
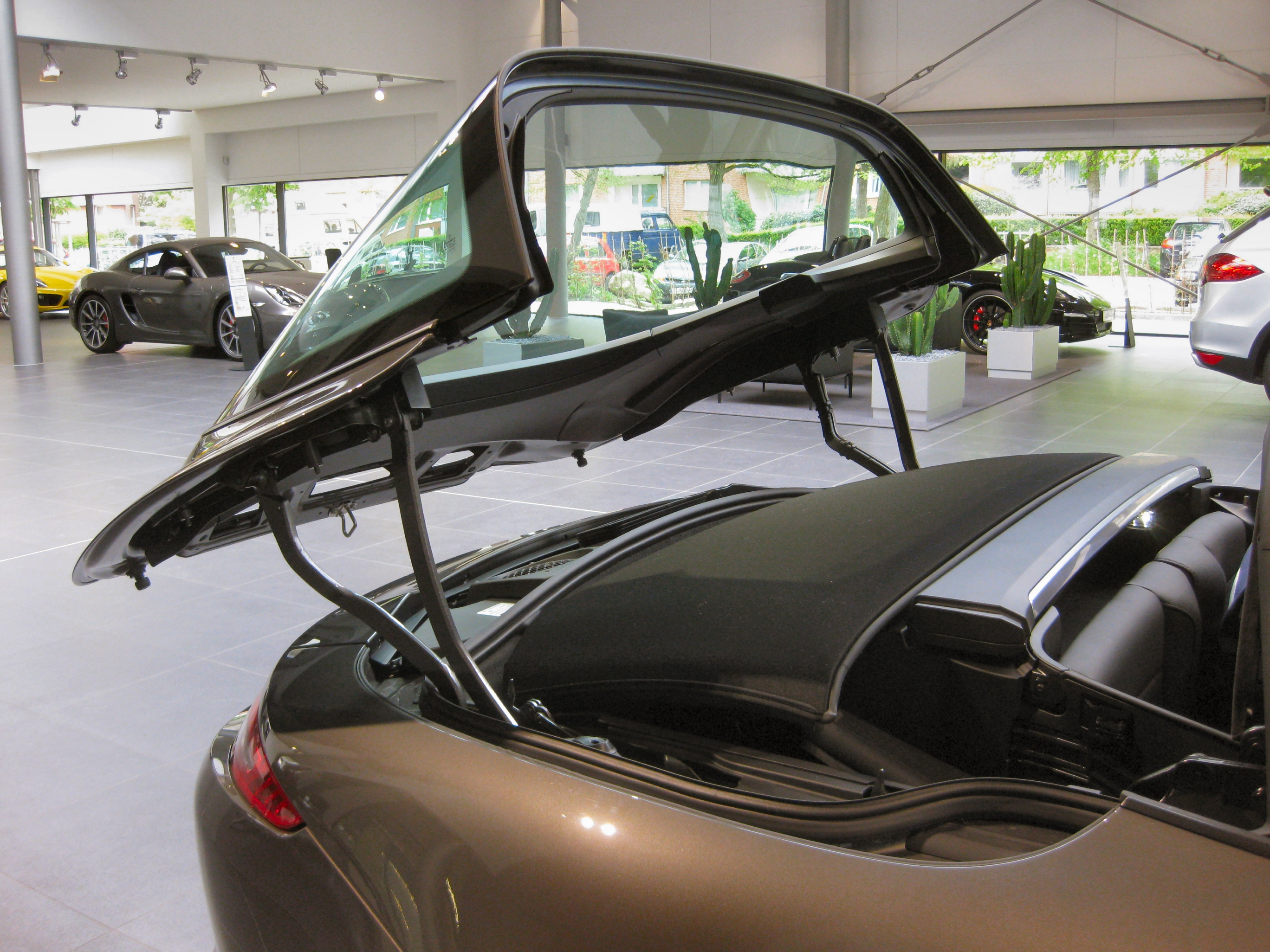
The Porsche 991 Targa top in stowed position while the rear glass roof is moved backwards

With the introduction and production of the latest two generations of 911, the Types 991 and 992, Porsche decided to take the Targa in a different direction from that of the previous water-cooled Type 996/997 cars. The latest Targas were introduced in 2013 and 2019, and unlike the Type 993/996/997 Targas, the newer cars have somewhat returned to their earliest Targa roots by using a solid roof panel spanning over the front seats. Unlike the manual lift-out panels of earlier 911s, though, the Type 991 and Type 992 Targas' roof panels are mechanized for automated lift-away and storage under the rear glass roof, which itself is mechanized to lift up and out of the way as the roof panel is placed into its stowed position. The Type 991 Targa also brought back the styling feature of the Targa bar that was perhaps the most obvious and overt design cue of the air-cooled generation Targas, but unlike the previous Targa hoops, the one used on the Type 991 is in sections, where the horizontal span member is a physically separate piece that itself is mechanized to lift off of its vertical supports to allow the solid roof panel and its motorized components to slide rearwards as the panel is being stored within the car.

== Rotating roof ==
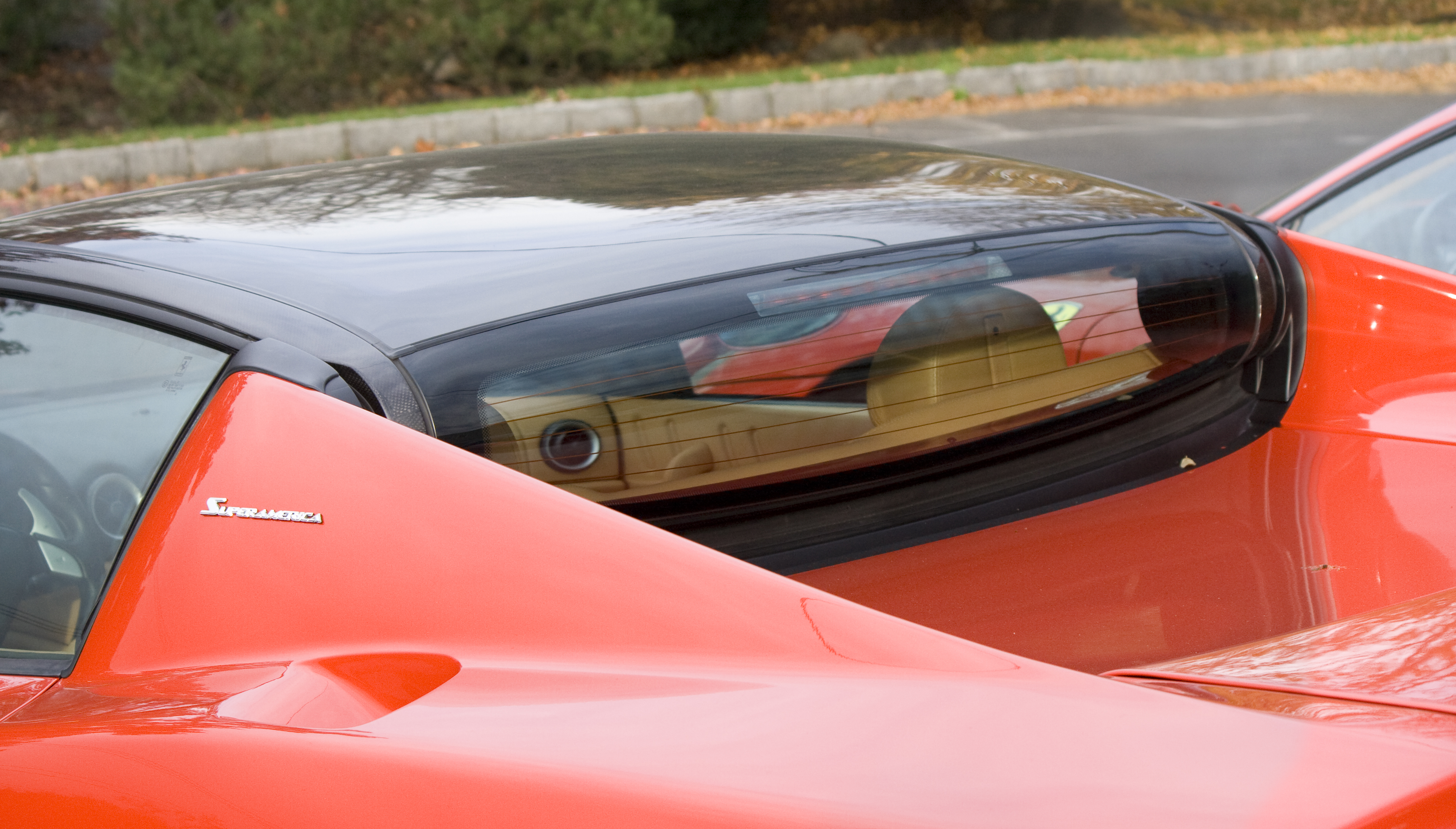
Ferrari Superamerica folding roof

Ferrari introduced a hybrid variation of the targa roof and folding metal roof with the 180° rotating roof featured on the 2005 Ferrari Superamerica designed by Leonardo Fioravanti, which was previewed on his Alfa Romeo Vola concept in 2000. The concept was also used in the 2010 Renault Wind.

== Examples of traditional targa tops ==
- Alfa Romeo Vola (2000 concept, rotating roof)
- AMC Eagle Sundancer (1980–1984)
- Bentley Continental SC
- BMW 3 Series Baur Cabriolets E21 TC1 (1978-1982), E30 TC2 (1983–1991), E36 TC4 (1992–1996)
- Bugatti Veyron Grand Sport/Vitesse (2009-2015)
- Chevrolet Corvette coupé (1984–current)
- Dodge Viper
- Ferrari 308 GTS
- Ferrari 328 GTS
- Ferrari 348 ts/GTS
- Dino 246 GTS
- Ferrari F355 GTS
- Ferrari F50
- Ferrari Superamerica (rotating roof)
- Fiat X1/9
- Ford GTX-1 (1966 12 Hours of Sebring winner)
- Ford GTX-1 Roadster (2005)
- GMC Hummer EV
- Honda CR-X del Sol
- Honda NSX-T
- Honda S660
- Jaguar XJ-SC "twin-targa" Cabriolet (1984–1988)
- Koenigsegg (all models)
- Lamborghini Diablo VT Roadster
- Lamborghini Miura Roadster (one-off)
- Lamborghini Aventador Roadster
- Lamborghini Silhouette
- Lamborghini Jalpa
- Lancia Beta Spider (Zagato)
- Lotus Elise
- Maserati MC12
- Matra 530
- Mazda MX-5 RF
- Mercedes-Benz Silver Lightning
- Nissan 100NX
- Nissan URGE
- Nissan 300ZX
- Opel Speedster
- Pontiac Solstice Coupe (2009)
- Porsche 911 Targa (1966–present)
- Porsche 912 Targa
- Porsche 914
- Porsche Carrera GT
- Porsche 918 Spyder
- Qvale Mangusta
- Renault Wind
- Saab Catherina prototype (1964)
- Smart Roadster
- Suzuki Samurai
- Suzuki Cappuccino (optional)
- Tesla Roadster (2008)
- Tesla Roadster (2020)
- Toyota Sports 800 (1965–1969)
- Toyota Supra
- Triumph TR4 Surrey top (1961)
- Triumph TR4A Surrey top (1965)
- Triumph TR250 Surrey top (1967)
- TVR Tuscan Speed Six

== See also ==
- Bimini top
- Convertible
- Dodger (sailing)
- Hardtop
- Sunroof
- T-top
