= Saab Catherina =

Concept car

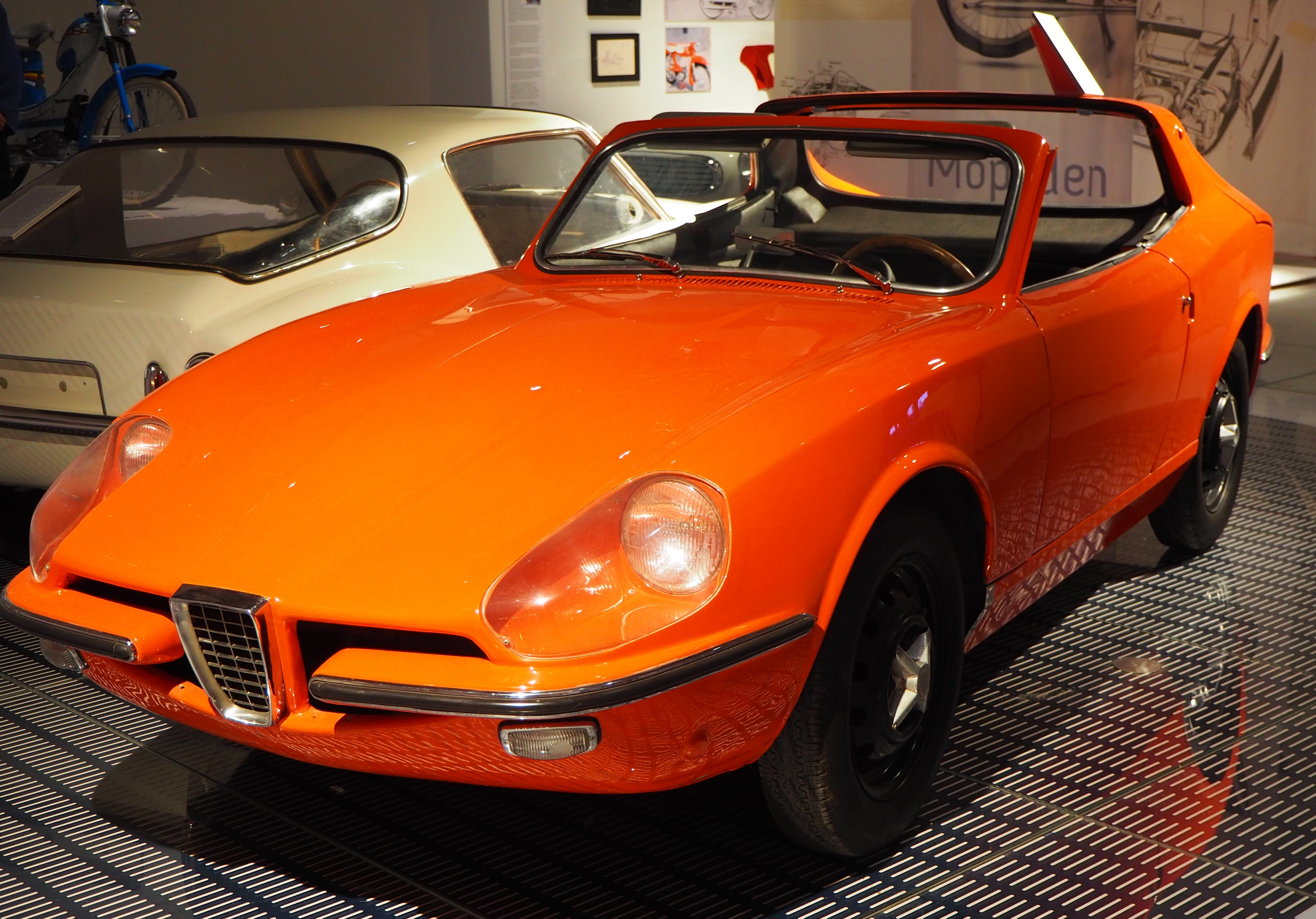
Prototype in SAAB museum Trollhättan

The Saab Catherina is a 1964 prototype automobile, commissioned by the Swedish automaker Saab, designed by Sixten Sason and made at the workshops of the Aktiebolaget Svenska Järnvägsverkstäderna (ASJ - the Swedish Railroad Works) in Katrineholm, Sweden (hence the name). It is a red, two-seat sports car with a targa top.

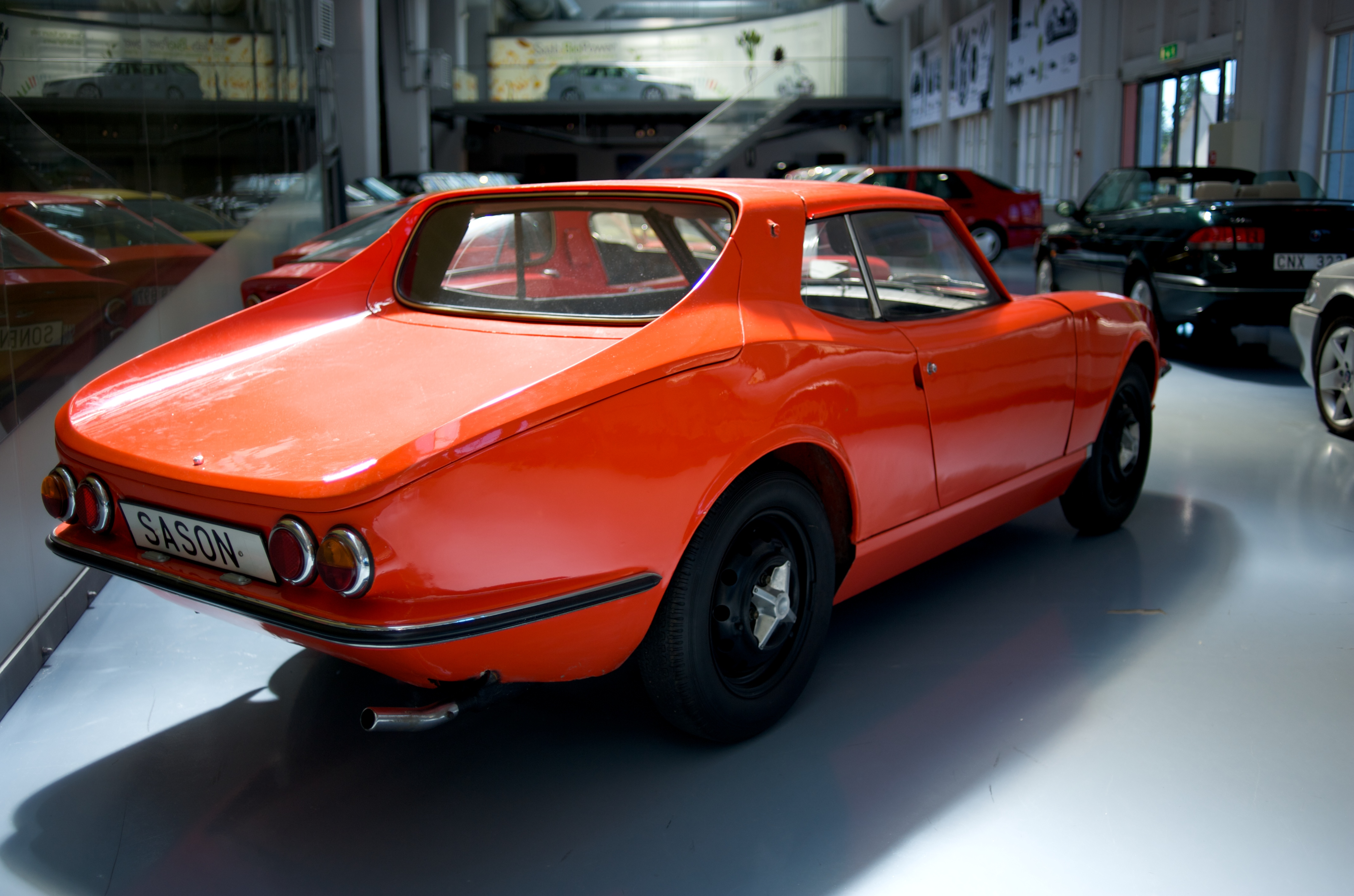
Rear view

Sason, who was working as a freelancer for Saab, made some drawings of a small sports coupé in the early 1960s. As Saab was planning to introduce a sports car model, the company commissioned him to adopt the design for mass production. The project began in January 1963 and in May the assembly of the prototype started at the ASJ. The prototype was first displayed, however, only on 24 April 1965, at the Linköping Sports Centre.

For economy reasons, the Catherina utilised many components of the contemporary Saab 96 and shared the same wheelbase, which was longer than the finally accepted design. Its unique feature was its targa top, which could be stowed in the luggage compartment of the car. Stemming from the design of an integral 'roll bar', it was still a new concept in the automotive industry, preceding the 1966 Porsche 911 Targa, which popularized it (and established the name). Sason also designed some other unusual features for the Catherina, such as the roof-mounted headlamps (for longer range), which were not included in the prototype because of the need to make the car fit for mass production.

After test drives on the prototype it was concluded that some more development work was needed. Meanwhile, another prototype, known as Saab MFI13, was prepared by the Malmö Flygindustri (MFI) and Saab chose it as a basis for its sports car, the Saab Sonett II. The Catherina ended up on display in the SAAB museum in Trollhättan, but Sason used some of the design cues previewed in the Catherina in his later design, the mass-market Saab 99.

In each book and newspaper article since the 60's this prototype has been referred to as 'Catherina', but the document from ASJs archive where Sixten Sason suggested the name of the car, it states Catharina. The same name is also found on the original name badge on the dashboard that since 2008 once again was re-fitted to the car at the Saab museum.
