= Ford V4 engine =

The Ford Motor Company built two models of 60° V4 engine in Europe:

- Ford Taunus V4 engine, 1962–1981, built in Germany

later developed into the Ford Cologne V6 engine

- Ford Essex V4 engine, 1965–1977, built in England

later developed into the Ford Essex V6 engine (UK)
