= Sergio Coggiola =

Italian automobile designer

Sergio Coggiola (1928-1989) was an Italian designer known primarily for his automotive work at Carrozzeria Ghia in Turin for 15 years — serving as the head of Ghia's prototype shop until 1952 — and later at his own company, Carrozzeria Coggiola, which he founded in 1966 in Orbassano, Italy, a commune of Turin.

In the 1980s, Coggiola freelanced for car manufacturers, sometimes executing third-party designs, such as Trevor Fiores' design of the concept car Citroën Karin, the Lamborghini Portofino or prototypes of the Renault Mégane. Coggiola also produced individual vehicles, special ordered by customers as one-off cars, including Bentley B2 and B3 coupés and convertibles, which Pininfarina had designed for the Sultan of Brunei — Coggiola making a total of 17 copies of this model from 1994 to 1996.

Other original work included the asymmetrically designed Coggiola Janus (1978), the Fiat Punto Surf pick-up study and the 2000 Coggiola T-Rex, an SUV that used a Hummer chassis.

Other work included the Saab Sonett III, Volvo 262C, Lancia Thema Coupé, Lancia Dunja (build only), Fiat Brava Sentiero, Pontiac CF 428 (with Paul Farago), the Copper Development Association (CDA) Exemplar I and the 1976 Honda Civic "Lady" prototype.

Carrozzeria Coggiola declined quickly after founder and owner Sergio Coggiola died suddenly. The other Turin design houses, including IDEA and Ital Design, declined offers to take over.

== See also ==
- Car body style
- Car classification
