= Saab 95 =

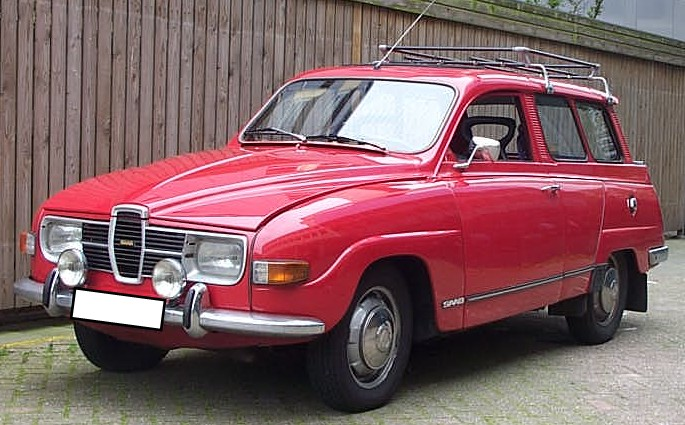

Overview
- Manufacturer: Saab Automobile
- Production: 1959–1978
- Assembly: Sweden: Trollhättan (Trollhättan Assembly); Finland: Uusikaupunki (Valmet Automotive)
- Designer: Sixten Sason

Body and chassis
- Class: Compact
- Body style: 3-door station wagon 3-door sedan delivery van
- Layout: FF layout
- Related: Saab 93; Saab 96

Powertrain
- Engine: 841 cc 2-stroke I3; 1,498 cc Ford V4; 1,698 cc Ford LC V4 (USA)
- Transmission: 4-speed manual

Dimensions
- Wheelbase: 2,500 mm (98.4 in)
- Length: 4,300 mm (169.3 in) (1969–1978)

Chronology
- Predecessor: Saab 93

The Saab 95 is a seven-seater, two-door station wagon produced by Swedish automaker Saab from 1959 to 1978.

Initially it was based on the Saab 93 sedan, but the model's development throughout the years followed closely that of the Saab 96, the successor of the Saab 93 from 1960. It was introduced in 1959, but because only 40 were made in 1959, production is often said to have started in 1960.

The first engine was an 841 cc three-cylinder two-stroke, but from 1967 onward, it became available with the same four-stroke Ford Taunus V4 engine as available for the Saab 96 and used in the Saab Sonett V4 and Sonett III. It had a four-speed manual transmission. There was a small handle on the firewall that, when pushed, put the car into a "freewheeling" mode. This allowed the driver to coast downhill without seizing the two-stroke engine, but when power was needed the transmission would engage and the driver could power the car up hill again. As the 95 received the four-speed gearbox before the 96 (that still had the old three-speed unit) it was also used for rallying.

In the US, the Saab 95 received the larger 1.7 litre V4 for the 1971 model year, as a response to tighter emissions regulations. The compression ratio was lowered to 8.0:1, meaning that the power remained at 73 hp (54 kW). The Saab 95/96 remained on sale in the United States until 1973.

A rear-facing folding seat was dropped with the 1976 model year, making the car a regular five-seater. Production ended in 1978 (when only 470 examples were built). A total of 110,527 were made.

For certain markets (Norway, Denmark) a special export version sedan delivery van was available without a rear seat and rear side windows.

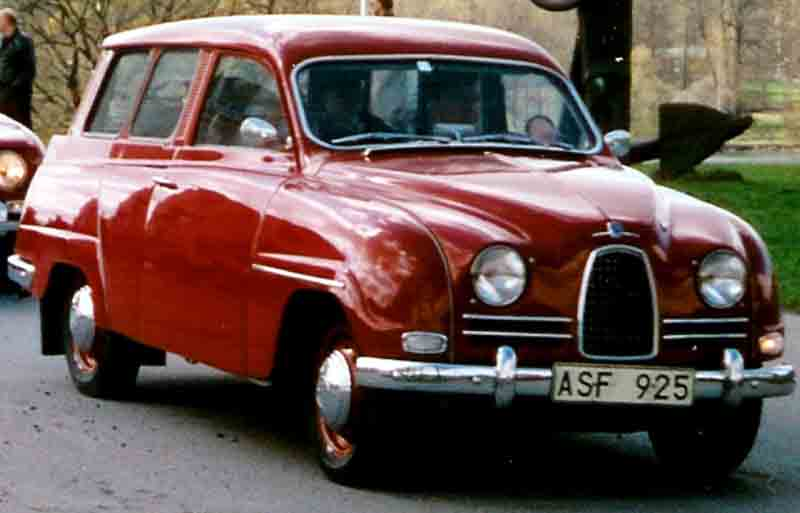
1961 Saab 95 De Luxe

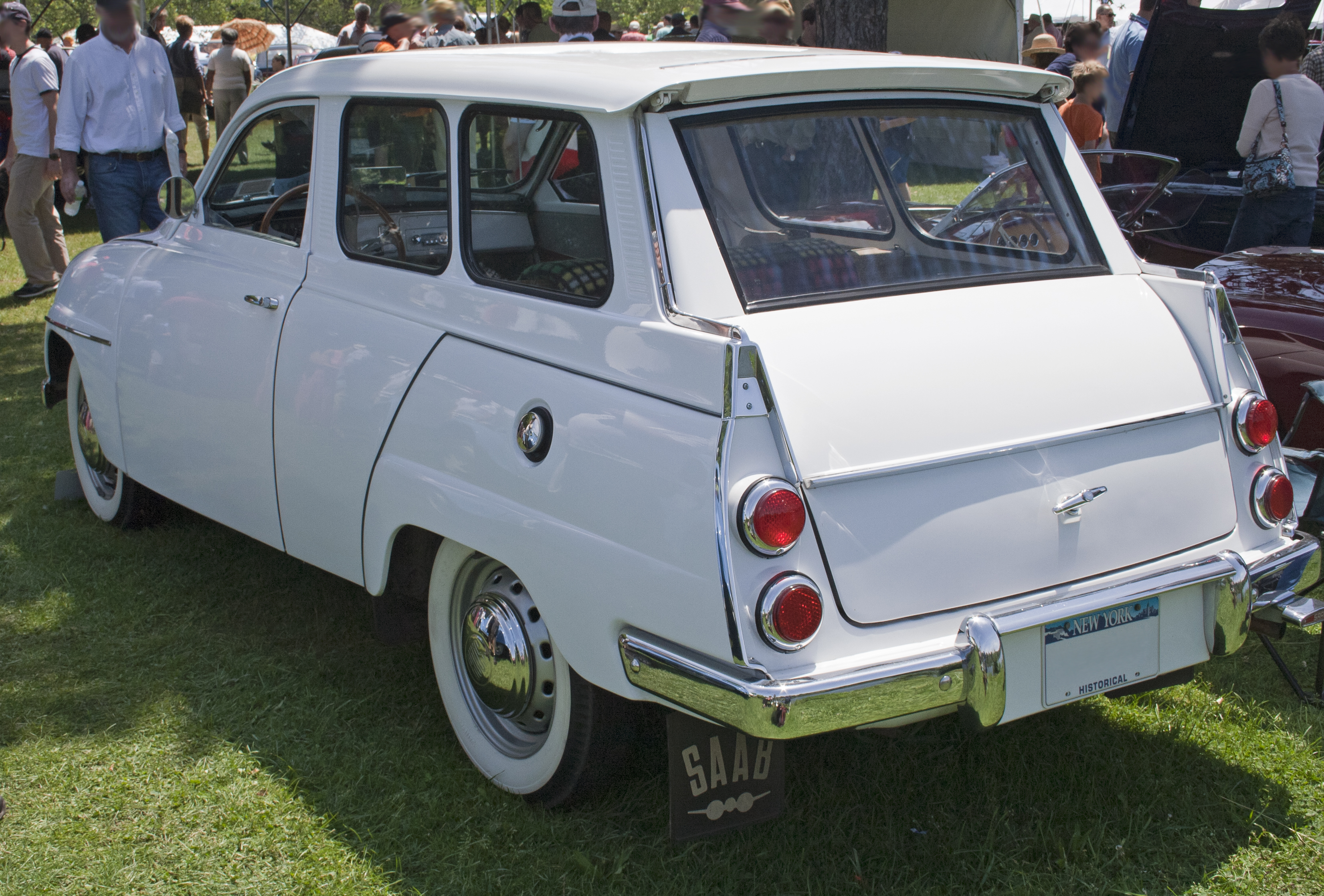
Rear view of 1963 Saab 95

== See also ==
- Saab 98
