= Sixten Sason =

Swedish industrial designer (1912–1967)

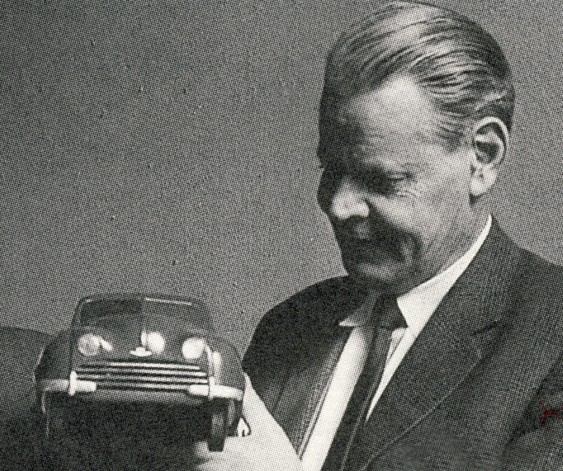
- Sason with a Saab 92, 1959
- Born: Karl-Erik Sixten Andersson; 12 March 1912; Skövde, Sweden
- Died: 1 April 1967 (aged 55); Solna, Sweden
- Occupation: industrial designer

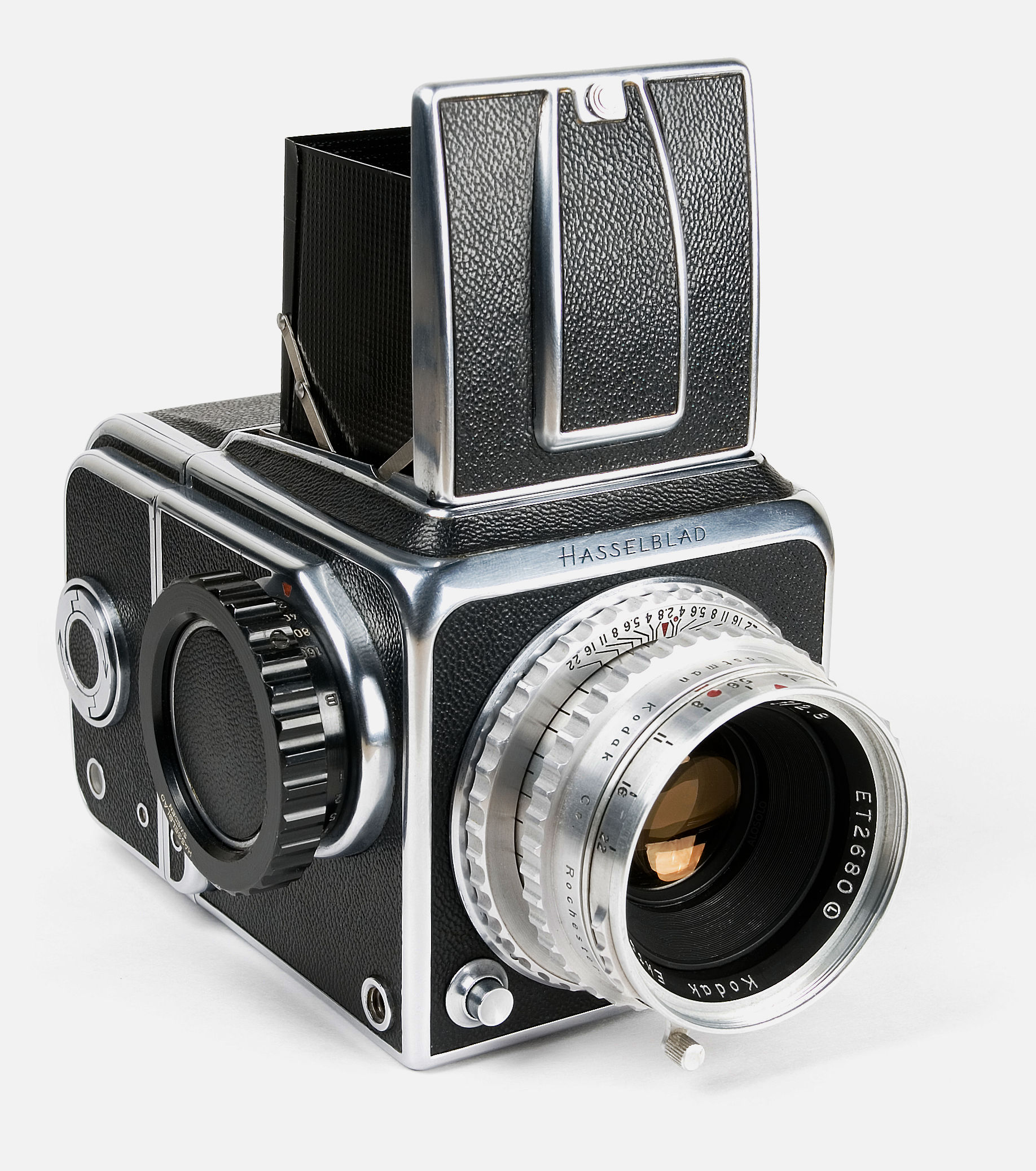
Hasselblad 1600F designed by Sason in 1948

Karl-Erik Sixten Sason (born Sixten Andersson; 12 March 1912 – 1 April 1967) was a Swedish industrial designer, noted for his work in designing several generations of Saab automobiles.

== Biographical ==
Sason was born in 1912, the son of a Swedish sculptor. He trained in Paris as an artist and later as an industrial designer. He had a stint in the Swedish Air Force until an injury disqualified him for flight. In the 1930s he became noted for his "x-ray" renderings of industrial products.

== Career with Saab ==
Sason started working for Saab, designing aircraft throughout World War II. In 1946, he was asked to contribute to Project 92, the result of which would be the first Saab automobile, the Saab 92 which began production in 1949. Sason remained with Saab, designing the 93, 95, 96, and 99, as well as the first Sonett. Following his death in 1967, Sason was succeeded by his colleague and one-time student, Björn Envall.

Many of the design elements that Sason implemented in the 99 continued as elements of Saab design into the 1990s.

== Other industrial designs ==
In addition to Saab, Sason designed consumer products for Electrolux (most notably the Z 70 vacuum cleaner in 1957), Hasselblad, where he designed their first camera model in 1949, and Husqvarna, designing such motorcycles as the Husqvarna Silverpilen, a high performance lightweight 175cc sold 1955–1965.

== Gallery of Sason designs ==
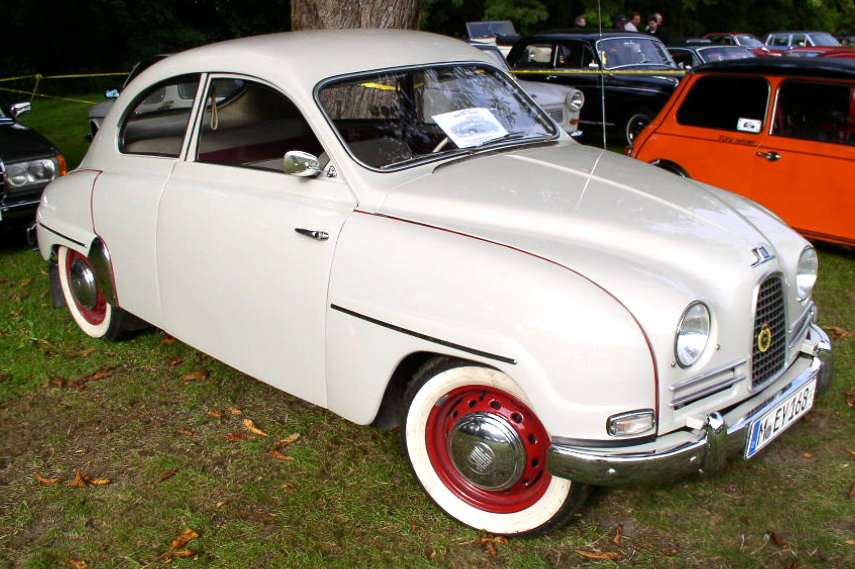
Saab 93 (ca. 1959)

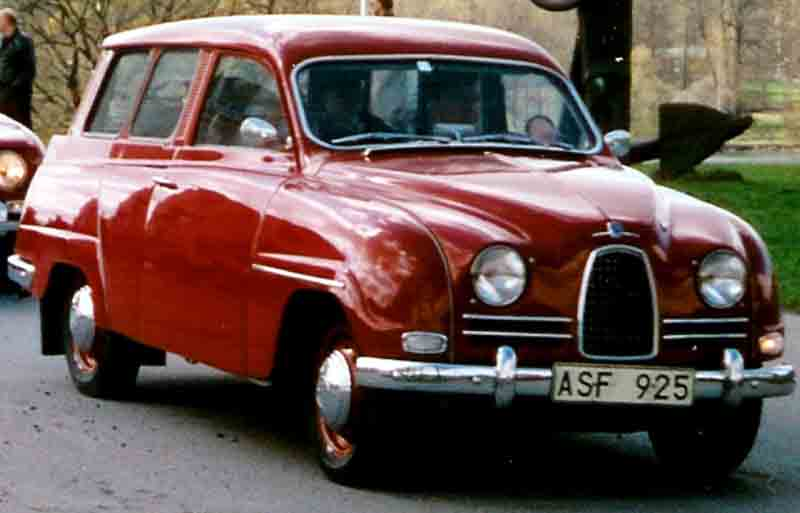
1961 Saab 95

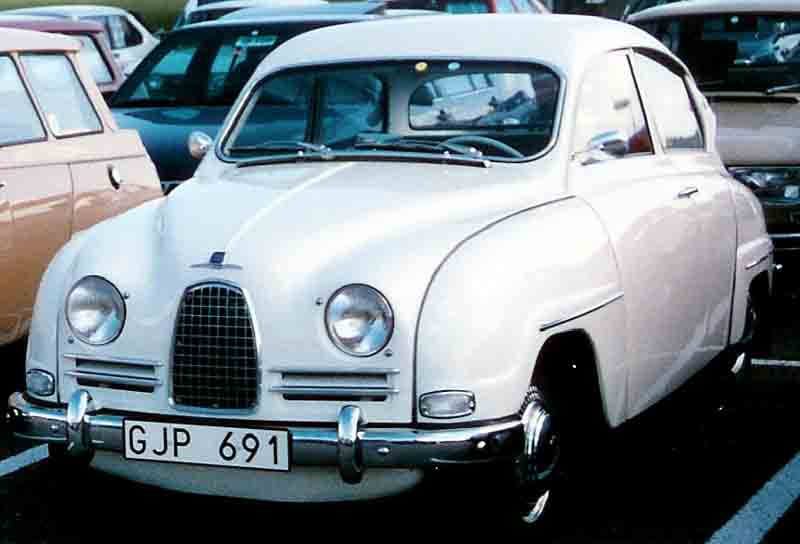
1961 Saab 96

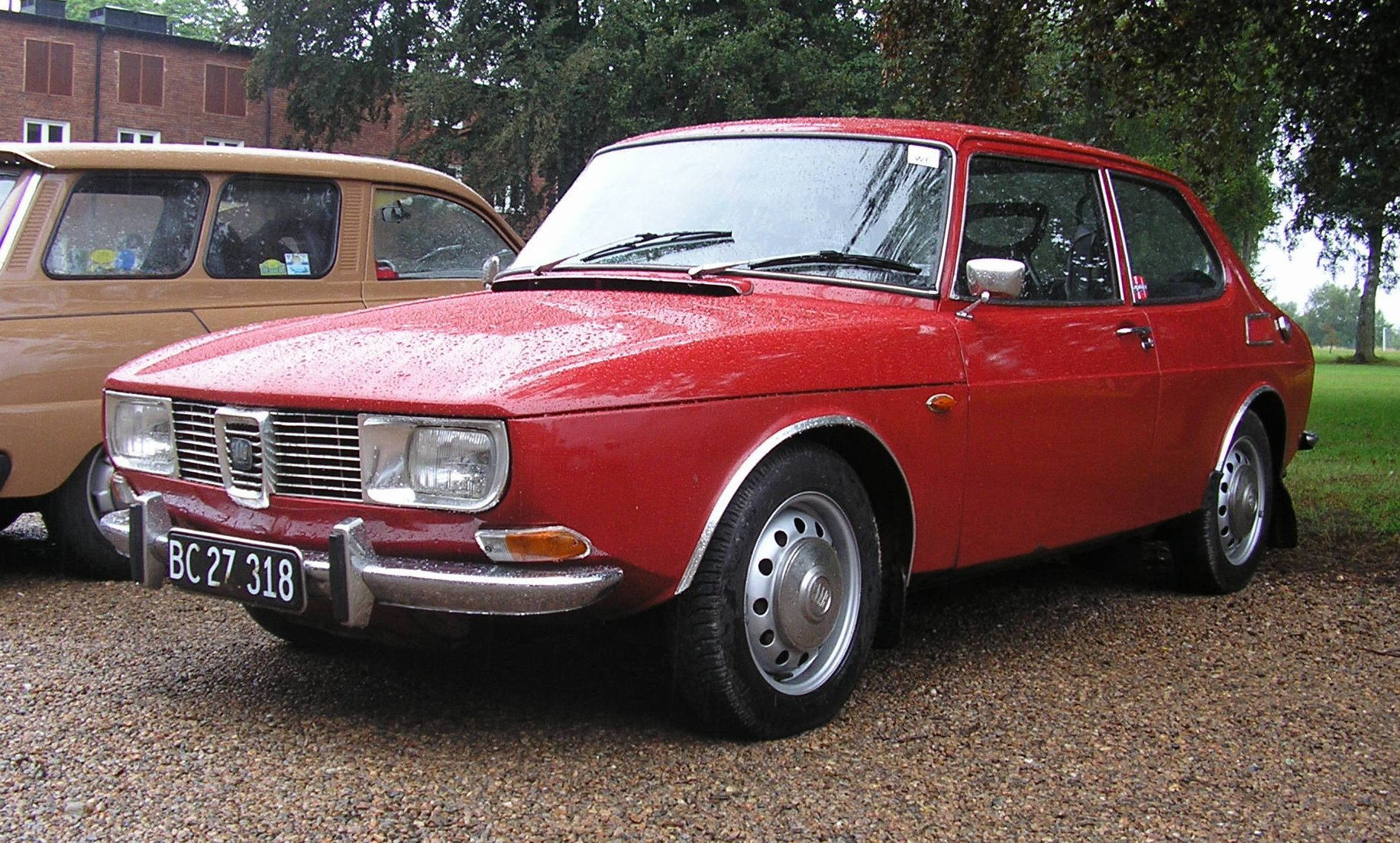
1969 Saab 99

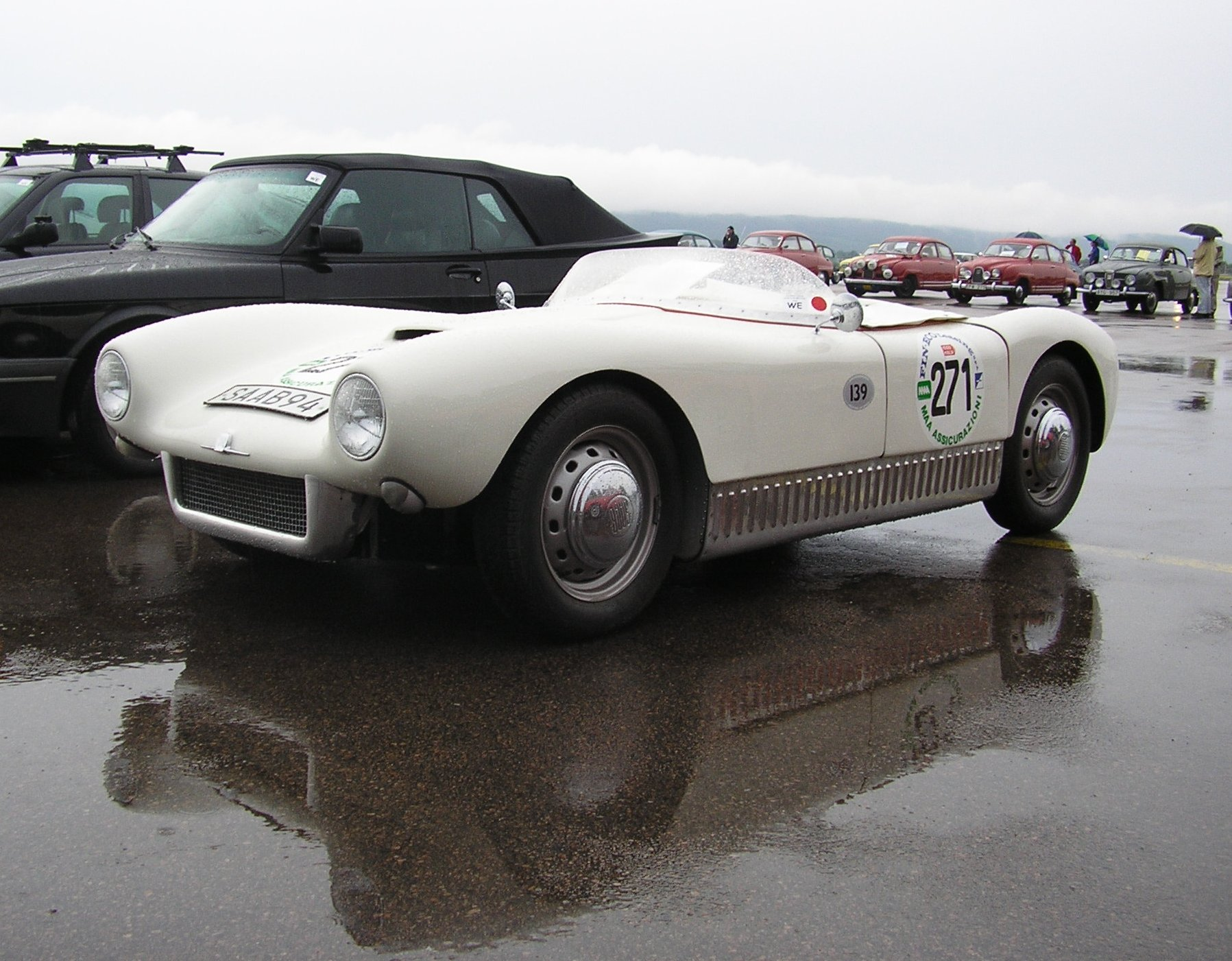
Saab Sonett I (ca. 1955)

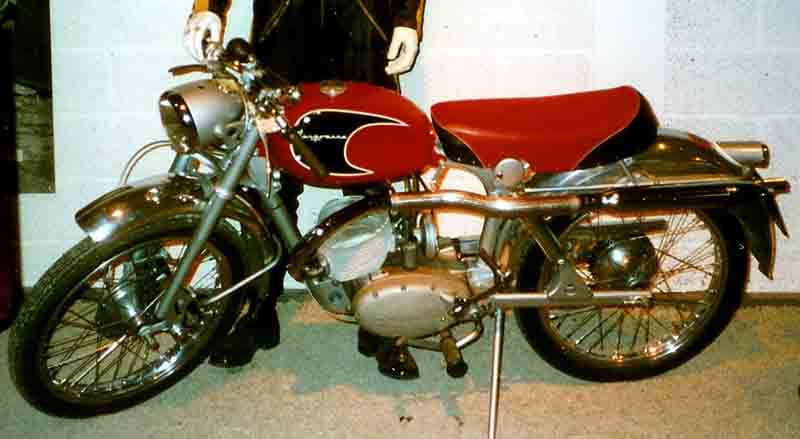
Husqvarna Silverpilen
