= Frog (disambiguation) =

A frog is a member of a diverse group of amphibians composing the order Anura.

Frog(s) or The Frog(s) may also refer to:

== Businesses and organizations ==
- Frog (models), a brand of model aircraft
- The Frogs (club), a twentieth century African American theatrical organization
- Frog Design (stylized 'frog, part of Capgemini Invent'), a design firm founded in 1969

== People ==
- Frog Fagan (1940–1993), NASCAR Winston Cup driver
- Frog Pocket, recording name of John Charles Wilson, a Scottish musician
- Frog Redus (1905–1979), American baseball infielder in the Negro leagues
- The Frog, a ring name of Canadian All Star Wrestling professional wrestler Terry Tomko

== Arts and entertainment ==
=== Games ===
- Frog (American card game), a card game of the German Tarok family
- Frog (patience), a patience or solitaire card game
- Frogs (video game), a 1978 single-player action arcade game

=== Literature ===
- Frog (novel), a 2009 novel by Mo Yan
- Frog, a 1991 novel by Stephen Dixon
- The Frogs, a play by Aristophanes

=== Fictional characters ===
- Frog (picture book character), in a series of picture books by Max Velthuijs
- Frog (Chrono Trigger), a video game character
- Crazy Frog, an animated character
- Michigan J. Frog, a Merrie Melodies cartoon character
- Frog, a title character in the Frog and Toad children's book series
- Frog, handle of the Smokey and the Bandit character Carrie, played by Sally Field
- Frogs, an alien species from German science-fiction series Raumpatrouille – Die phantastischen Abenteuer des Raumschiffes Orion
- Frog, one of the main characters in the TV series WordWorld

=== Music ===
- Frog (band), an American Indie rock band
- Frog (album), a 2002 album by Merzbow
- "Frogs", a song by Alice in Chains from their 1995 album Alice in Chains
- The Frogs (band), an American rock music band founded in 1980
  - The Frogs (album), 1988
- The Frogs (musical), a 1974 musical adaptation of Aristophanes' play
- Frog Records, a UK classic jazz record label
- Bow frog, a block which holds the hair at the grip end of a string instrument's bow

=== Film and television ===
- Frog (film), a 1987 television film starring Shelley Duvall and Elliott Gould
- "Frogs!", a 1993 film sequel to Frog
- Frogs (film), a 1972 horror film directed by George McCowan
- "Frogs", an episode of the television series Teletubbies
- The Frog (film), a 1937 film starring Noah Beery, Jack Hawkins and Gordon Harker
- The Frog (Iranian TV series), a 2020 Iranian series directed by Houman Seyyedi
- The Frog (South Korean TV series), a 2024 South Korean series directed by Mo Wan-il
- The WB, a television network nicknamed The Frog

== Science and technology ==
- FROG, a block cipher in cryptography
- Fast and Realistic OpenGL Displayer, a toolkit for physics data visualisation
- Frequency-resolved optical gating, a method for measuring ultra-fast laser pulses

=== Biology ===
- Frog (horse anatomy), part of a horse's hoof
- Xenopus laevis, or the frog in genetics
- Salientia, the clade for frogs, toads, proto-frogs

== Military ==
- Flame Resistant Organizational Gear, flame resistant clothing developed for the US Marine Corps
- 2K6 Luna (NATO reporting name: FROG-3 and FROG-5), a Soviet short-range artillery rocket system
- 9K52 Luna-M (NATO reporting name: FROG-7), a Soviet short-range artillery rocket system
- Matilda Frog, an Australian flamethrower variant of the British Second World War Matilda II tank

== Geography ==
- Frog, Texas, a US unincorporated community
- Frog City (disambiguation)
- Frog Creek (West Virginia), US
- Frog Lake (disambiguation)
- Frog Mountain, a mountain in Alabama, US

== Railroads ==
- Frog, the point where two rails cross in a railroad switch
- Rerail frog, a ramp device; see Glossary of rail terminology

== Tool parts ==
- Frog, an indentation in a brick
- Frog, part of a mouldboard plough
- Frog, part of a plane (tool)
- Frog, part of a sheath or scabbard for an edged tool or weapon; see Kukri#Scabbard

== Other uses ==
- Frog (dinghy), small dinghy
- Frog (fastening), ornamental braiding for the front of a garment
- Frog (pejorative), an ethnic slur for French or French-Canadian people
- Frog (Malaysian politics), a term used in Malaysian politics to describe party switching
- Frog pose, a froglike position in yoga as exercise, also called Mandukasana
- Frog, folding bicycle produced by Riese und Müller
- Frogging, the act of ripping out stitches in knitting

== See also ==
- Frogman, a type of scuba diver
- Frog shark, a species of shark
- Toads and Frogs, a combinatorial game
- Frog and Toad
- FRG (disambiguation)
- Frogger (disambiguation)
- Frogging (disambiguation)
- Toad (disambiguation)
