= Toad (disambiguation) =

A toad is any of a number of species within the amphibian order Anura.

Toad may also refer to:

== Fictional characters ==
- Mr. Toad, in Kenneth Grahame's children's novel The Wind in the Willows
- Toad (Marvel Comics) or Mortimer Toynbee, a villain in The X-Men
- Toad (Mario), a mushroom-like character in the Mario franchise
- Toad the Brake Van, a character in The Railway Series and in Thomas and Friends
- Toad, a character in the Frog and Toad children's books
- Terry "the Toad", in the movie American Graffiti

== Music ==
- Toad (band), a Swiss rock band
  - Toad (album), their debut album
- "Toad" (instrumental), a 1966 instrumental by Cream from Fresh Cream
- "Toad", a 1994 song by Die Monster Die from Withdrawal Method
- Theory of a Deadman, a Canadian rock band

== Other uses ==
- GWR Toad, a railway brake van
- Toad (solitaire), a solitaire card game
- Toad (software), a database management tool
- Saab Toad, a prototype of the Saab 99
- USS Toad (1914), a United States Navy patrol boat in commission from 1918 to 1919
- The Oxford Artisan Distillery (TOAD), a distillery in Oxford, England
- TOAD, a line of computers by XKL
- Toad in the hole (game), a pub game

== See also ==
- Salientia, the clade for frogs, toads, proto-frogs
- True toad, anurans within the family Bufonidae
- Horned toad or horned lizard, various species in the genus Phrynosomatidae
- Toad the Wet Sprocket, an American rock band
- Toadies, an American rock band
- Toads and Frogs
- Frog and Toad
- Frog (disambiguation)
