= Frog Lake =

Frog Lake may refer to:

- Frog Lake, Alberta, a Cree community in Canada, site of the
  - Frog Lake Massacre
- Frog Lake (Colchester), a lake of Colchester County, in Nova Scotia, Canada
- Frog Lake (Guysborough), a lake of Guysborough District, in Nova Scotia, Canada
- Frog Lake (Idaho), an alpine lake in Custer County, Idaho, United States
- Frog Lake (Nova Scotia), a lake of Halifax Regional Municipality, Nova Scotia, Canada
- Frog Lake (Oregon), any of at least 10 features in the U.S. state of Oregon, including:
  - Frog Lake (Wasco County, Oregon)
- Frog Lakes, in the Stikine Ranges of British Columbia, Canada
