= Golden poison frog (disambiguation) =

The golden poison frog (Phyllobates terribilis) is a poison dart frog in the family Dendrobatidae endemic to the Pacific coast of Colombia.

Golden poison frog may also refer to:

- Mantella, a genus of toxic frogs in the family Mantellidae endemic to Madagascar, sometimes referred to collectively as "golden frogs"
  - Golden mantella (Mantella aurantiaca), a small, poisonous, terrestrial frog in the family Mantellidae native to Madagascar
- Panamanian golden frog (Atelopus zeteki), a critically endangered poisonous toad in the family Bufonidae endemic to Panama

== See also ==
- Golden frog (disambiguation)
- Frog (disambiguation)
