= Puss in the Corner (disambiguation) =

Puss in the Corner is a patience or solitaire card game.

Puss in the corner may also refer to:

- Puss in the corner (children's game)
- "Les quatre coins", from Jeux d'enfants
- A quilt square pattern
