= Caffort 12Aa =

Aircraft engine

12Aa
- Type: 12-cylinder, water-cooled, horizontally-opposed piston engine
- National origin: France
- Manufacturer: Anciens Etablissements Caffort Frères
- First run: 1926

The Caffort 12Aa was a 12-cylinder, horizontally-opposed, piston aircraft engine designed and built in France during the latter half of the 1920s.

== Design and development ==
Having produced automobile and aircraft engine parts under contract during WWI, the Caffort brothers set about the task of producing their own aircraft engine, under a licence from "Bertrand-Solanet", of whom there is very little known, leaving the Caffort 12Aa as a testament.

Built largely from cast Aluminium alloys the 12Aa was a geared engine with four Zenith carburetors supplying mixture to the lower intake valves. Four camshafts at the corners of the crankcase operated two intake valves and two exhaust valves per cylinder, also driving oil pumps and other accessories. The four magnetos were mounted on transverse shafts driven from the crankshaft at the front of the engine. A single water pump was mounted on the rear cover, driven directly from the crankshaft.

== Specifications (12Aa) ==
Data from Jane's all the World's Aircraft 1928

=== General characteristics ===
- Type: 12 cylinder water-cooled horizontally-opposed piston engine
- Bore: 145 mm (5.7 in)
- Stroke: 150 mm (5.9 in)
- Displacement: 29.73 L (1,814.24 cu in)
- Dry weight: 550 kg (1,210 lb) dry

=== Components ===
- Valvetrain: 4x camshafts operating inlet and exhaust valves via fully enclosed push-rods and rockers
- Fuel system: 4x Zenith carburetors
- Fuel type: Aviation gasoline
- Oil system: Dry sump pressure system
- Cooling system: water-cooled
- Reduction gear: 0.53:1 two-stage spur gear to co-axial propeller shaft

=== Performance ===
- Power output: 370 kW (500 hp) maximum at 2,200 rpm
- Specific fuel consumption: 0.335 kg/kW hour (0.55 lb/hp hour)
