= Frog (patience) =

Card game

Frog (also known as Toad) is an old French patience or solitaire card game which is played with two decks of playing cards. It belongs to the same family of solitaire games as Strategy, Sir Tommy, Calculation, and Puss in the Corner. Game-play is like Sir Tommy, but with two decks, a fifth waste pile, and a Canfield-like reserve (referred to as the 'Frog'). In its native France it is known as Le Crapaud ("The Toad").

It is one of the few solitaire games that relies almost entirely on skill.

== Rules ==
Thirteen cards are dealt face up to become the reserve, also known as the "Frog." Any aces that are about to be dealt are separated and placed in the foundations; they are not counted in the reserve count. Once the reserve is formed, it is then squared up (i. e. arranged to become one neat pile) and placed face up. The aces that are separated in making the reserve are placed next to the reserve. In case there is no ace segregated in making the reserve, an ace is removed from the stock to become the first foundation.

The foundations are built up regardless of suit up to kings. The aces already in the foundations can be built immediately while any ace that becomes available in the game is placed in the foundations.

The cards are dealt one at a time onto one of five wastepiles. It is the player's discretion where each pile is placed as long as it is placed in one of only five wastepiles. The top cards of each wastepile is available for play to the foundations. The same goes for the top card of the reserve. However, once a card is in a wastepile, it stays there until it can be built on the foundations. Also, there is no redeal.

The game ends long after the stock runs out. The game is won when all cards are built in the foundations.

As in the other games mentioned above, it is a good idea to reserve a wastepile for both kings and queens and to build downwards whenever possible in order to win.

== Variations ==
Fly is a solitaire card game which is played the same way as Frog. The difference is that the aces are removed and placed in the foundations before the game begins. In this game, the reserve is called the "Fly."

== See also ==
- Sir Tommy
- List of solitaires
- Glossary of solitaire
