= Colours (card game) =

Solitaire card game

Colours is a patience or card solitaire game which is played using a single pack of playing cards. It is in the same family as Sir Tommy, Strategy, and Calculation.

Colours is so called because of its emphasis on colour. The game is a variation of Lady Betty.

== Rules ==
The cards are shuffled, then dealt out one by one onto the foundations or onto one of six waste piles, the top cards of which are available for building only on the foundations.

A two, a three, a four, and a five are needed to start the foundations. The deuce and the four should be of one colour (regardless of suit) and the trey and the five be of the other colour. Naturally, the colour of the first foundation card that turns up during dealing dictates the colours of the other cards. The foundations are built up by colour.

Dealing of cards from the stock continues until the stock runs out. The game is out when all of the cards are built onto the foundations, which should have an ace, a deuce, a trey, and a four on top.

== Variations ==
Lady Betty is similar to Sir Tommy in that it requires you to build the foundations by suit rather than colour, but similar to Colours it gives two extra tableau piles to work with.

== See also ==
- Sir Tommy
- List of solitaires
- Glossary of solitaire

== Sources ==
- Dalton, Basil. The Complete Patience Book
- Hervey, George F. Enjoying Card Games for One
- Parlett, David. The Penguin Book of Patience
