= FRG =

FRG may refer to:

- Family Readiness Group in the United States Army
- Germany (the Federal Republic of Germany, 1990–present)
  - West Germany (the Federal Republic of Germany, 1949–1990)
- FMN reductase (NAD(P)H)
- Friendship Radiosport Games
- Functional renormalization group
- Guatemalan Republican Front (Spanish: Frente Republicano Guatemalteco), a defunct political party in Guatemala
- Republic Airport in East Farmingdale, New York, United States
