= Musical (card game) =

Musical is a patience or card solitaire using a single deck of 52 playing cards. It is similar to another old game called Calculation except there is no tableau to play in and there is only one wastepile rather than four.

== Names ==
The original and most common name of this game is Musical, Cheney (1869) says this is because "it is a very ingenious arrangement of numbers in two scales". Alternative names are Betsy Ross, Fairest, Four Kings, Plus Belle and Quadruple Alliance.

== Rules ==
To begin the game, four cards are removed from the deck and placed in a row: an ace, a two, a three, and a four. Another four cards are placed in a row below those four cards: a two, a four, a six, and an eight. The table below shows how this is arranged:

A	2	3	4
2	4	6	8

The cards on the second row compose the foundations themselves, while the cards on the row above denote how the cards should be built on the foundations. The foundation placed under the ace starts with the two and it is built in ones. The foundation under the two starts with the four and it is built in twos, and so on. The table below shows how the foundations should be built:

Signs & Foundations	A	2	3	4	5	6	7	8	9	10	J	Q	K
Signs & Foundations	2	4	6	8	10	Q	A	3	5	7	9	J	K
Signs & Foundations	3	6	9	Q	2	5	8	J	A	4	7	10	K
Signs & Foundations	4	8	Q	3	7	J	2	6	10	A	5	9	K

What makes this different from Calculation is how the cards in the stock are dealt. There is no tableau to place the cards from the stock. Instead, there is a wastepile where cards from the stock are placed. Cards from the stock are laid one at a time to the wastepile and can be placed on the foundations if possible and/or necessary. Only the top card of the wastepile is available for play and once the stock has run out, the cards on the wastepile are turned over and become the stock. This conversion from leftover cards on the wastepile to stock can be done twice in the game.

The game is won when every card from the stock is built on the foundations. The game is lost, however, if it ends with cards still on the wastepile that cannot be transferred to the foundations.

== See also ==
- Calculation
- List of patiences and solitaires
- Glossary of patience and solitaire terms

== Bibliography ==
- Barry, Sheila Anne, World's Best Card Games for One
- Cheney, Mrs. E. D. (1869). Patience: A Series of Games with Cards. 2nd edn, with additions. Boston: Lee & Shepard. NY: Lee, Shepard & Dillingham.
- Moyse Jr, Alphonse. 150 Ways to play Solitaire
- Morehead, Albert H. & Mott-Smith, Geoffrey (2001). The Complete Book of Solitaire & Patience Games
- Parlett, David (1979). The Penguin Book of Patience
