= Saab 90 =

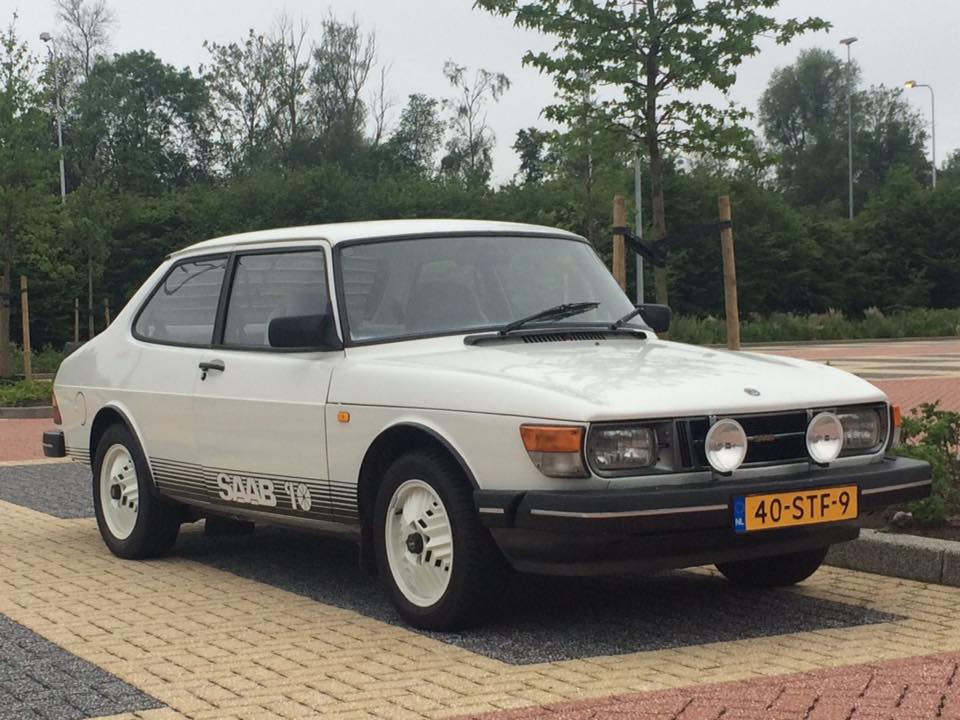
- Saab 90

Overview
- Manufacturer: Saab
- Production: September 1984–1987
- Assembly: Finland: Uusikaupunki (Saab-Valmet)
- Designer: Björn Envall

Body and chassis
- Class: Family car (D-segment)
- Body style: 2-door coupé
- Layout: Longitudinal front-engine, front-wheel drive
- Related: Saab 99; Saab 900

Powertrain
- Engine: 2.0 L H I4
- Transmission: 4-speed manual 5-speed manual

Chronology
- Predecessor: Saab 99

The Saab 90 is a family car produced by Saab from September 1984 to 1987. It was manufactured at a facility in Uusikaupunki, Finland, at that time owned by a joint venture with Finnish Valmet called Saab-Valmet. The 90 was a continuation of the Saab 99, and it was basically a Saab 99 from the B-pillar forward with the rear of a Saab 900 sedan. The 90, while easier to build than the 99, was still considerably more labour-intensive than the more modern 900.

== History ==
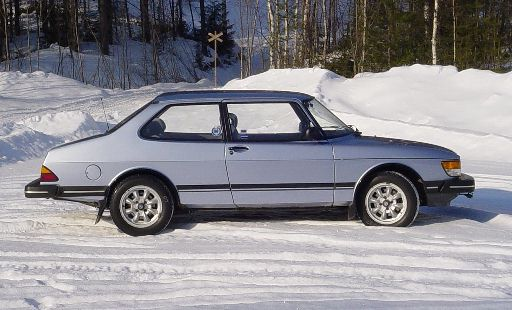
Saab 90 side profile

When the production of the Saab 96 was completed in 1980, the head of Saab's passenger car division, Sten Wennlo, was under intense pressure to create a new base model for the European market. Also people at Saab-Valmet were concerned about the fate of the Saab 99, as its production took place entirely in Uusikaupunki. Saab-Valmet's first solution from 1983 was to weld the front end of a Saab 900 together with the rear end of a 99. When the product was shown to Wennlo, he stated that the principle was good, but the car became too much like the 900.

Wennlo thought that the car should be done the other way around, and in March 1984 he asked Rony Lutz, who worked as an illustrator at Saab, to cut together two press images on the front of a Saab 99 and the rear of a Saab 900 sedan.

The sheet metal workers at Saab-Valmet in Uusikaupunki thus welded together two bodies in the same way and only then was the car shown to Björn Envall, who was then design manager at Saab.

That the name was changed from 99 to 90 was because the name would harmonize better with the Saab 900 and the then new Saab 9000.

== Model overview ==
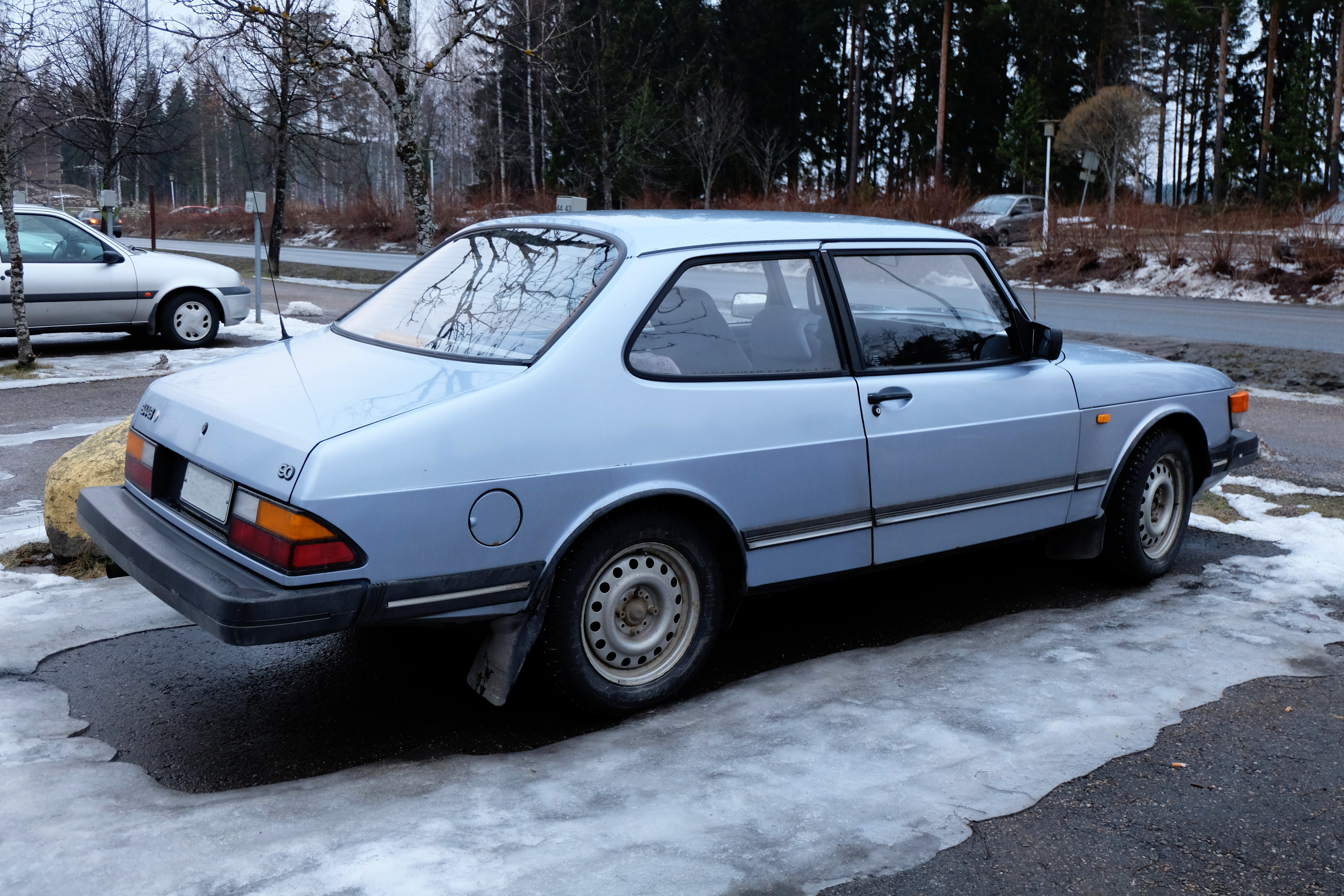
Rear view of Saab 90

In 1985, the Saab 90 was only available as a two-door sedan and it came with the 2.0-litre Saab H engine, giving 100 PS (74 kW; 99 hp).

It was available with both four and a five-speed manual transmissions, with the five-speed receiving closer gearing, front and rear spoilers, and lower profile tires. Also the transmission was changed and with the new rear end, the volume of the fuel tank increased and also the luggage compartment volume increased from 320 to 377 liters. The car got a modern rear wheel suspension which was also cheaper to manufacture.

The valve seats were hardened so it could run on unleaded fuel. It also had a new starter motor, and the steering wheel was more upright than the one in the 99.

In 1986 it underwent some minor cosmetic changes. It gained a radio option and side turn signals. The 4-speed model got the 5.5-inch wide wheels and was fitted with modified shock absorbers.

In 1987 the Zenith carburettor was altered to make it easier to start in cold weather.

=== Saab 90 Lumikko ===
A limited edition Saab 90 Lumikko (Note: Lumikko is Finnish for least weasel (Mustela nivalis), known as Snow weasel in Scandinavia.) was made for the Finnish market. Ten examples were made by Finnish Scan-Auto in 1985. The Lumikko received Saab's Airflow kit, spoiler, rims from Saab 900 Aero, sunroof, center console with extra gauges, leather steering wheel, and Saab factory speakers. These models were all white, including the wheels, bumpers, grille, side mirrors, spoiler, and door handles. No modifications were made under the hood.

All ten 90 Lumikkos took part at Scan-Auto's 20th anniversary celebration at Tampere in November 1985 and were part of the parade through the city.

There are currently only three 90 Lumikkos in working order. All of them are owned by the Finnish Saab club.

== Sales, reception and legacy ==
In total, 25,378 Saab 90s were made. It was sold in a limited number of European countries only. The production took place only in Uusikaupunki, Finland, by Valmet Automotive.

About 10,000 cars were sold in Sweden. A total of 1,154 Saab 90s were delivered and sold in the Netherlands, of which 446 in 1985, 451 in 1986 and 257 in 1987. About 600 vehicles were delivered to Germany.

Falling sales meant that it was not worth the investment to catalyze the engine and 1987 was the final year for the model. The last car was built on 1 July and it was immediately dispatched to the Saab museum in Trollhättan.
