= Saab 99 =

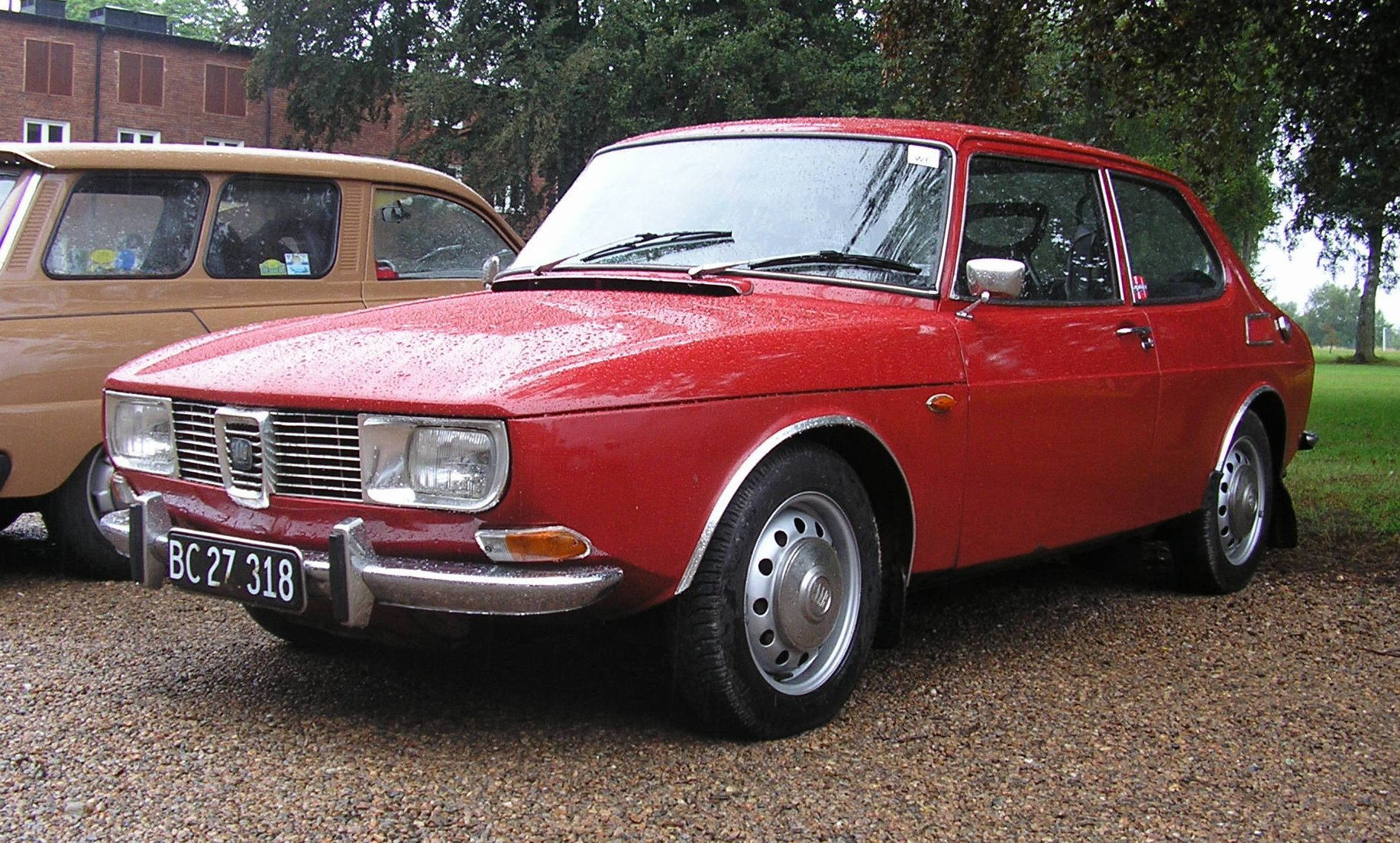

Overview
- Manufacturer: Saab Automobile
- Production: 1968–1984
- Assembly: Sweden: Trollhättan (Trollhättan Assembly); Finland: Uusikaupunki (Saab-Valmet)
- Designer: Sixten Sason

Body and chassis
- Class: Compact executive car (D)
- Body style: 2/4-door saloon 3/5-door combi coupé
- Layout: Longitudinal front-engine, front-wheel drive

Powertrain
- Engine: 1709 cc Slant-4 I4; 1854 cc Slant-4 I4; 1985 cc B I4; 1985 cc H I4 (1982–1984)
- Transmission: 4/5-speed manual 3-speed Borg-Warner 35 automatic

Dimensions
- Wheelbase: 2,473 mm (97.4 in)
- Length: 4,340 mm (170.9 in) (coupé)
- Width: 1,676 mm (66.0 in) (coupé)
- Height: 1,450 mm (57.1 in) (coupé)

Chronology
- Predecessor: Saab 96
- Successor: Saab 90; Saab 900

The Saab 99 is a car produced by Swedish manufacturer Saab from 1968 to 1984, their first foray into a larger class than the Saab 96. While considered a large family car in Scandinavia, it was marketed as a niche compact executive car in most other markets. It was manufactured both in Sweden and Finland and was succeeded by the Saab 900, although the 99 continued to be produced alongside its successor. The Saab 90, an updated, less complex version using many 900 parts took over from the 99 in late 1984.

== Development ==
On 2 April 1964, Gudmund's day in Sweden, after several years of planning, the Saab board started Project Gudmund. This was a project to develop a new and larger car to take the manufacturer beyond the market for the smaller Saab 96. This new car became the Saab 99, designed by Sixten Sason and unveiled in Stockholm on November 22, 1967.

The first prototypes of the 99 were built by cutting a Saab 96 lengthwise and widening it by 20 centimetres (7.9 in); this created the so-called Paddan (The toad), which was a disguise for the new project. After that phase, also as a disguise, the first 99 body shell was badged "Daihatsu" as that name could be made up out of the badging available for the Saab Sport.

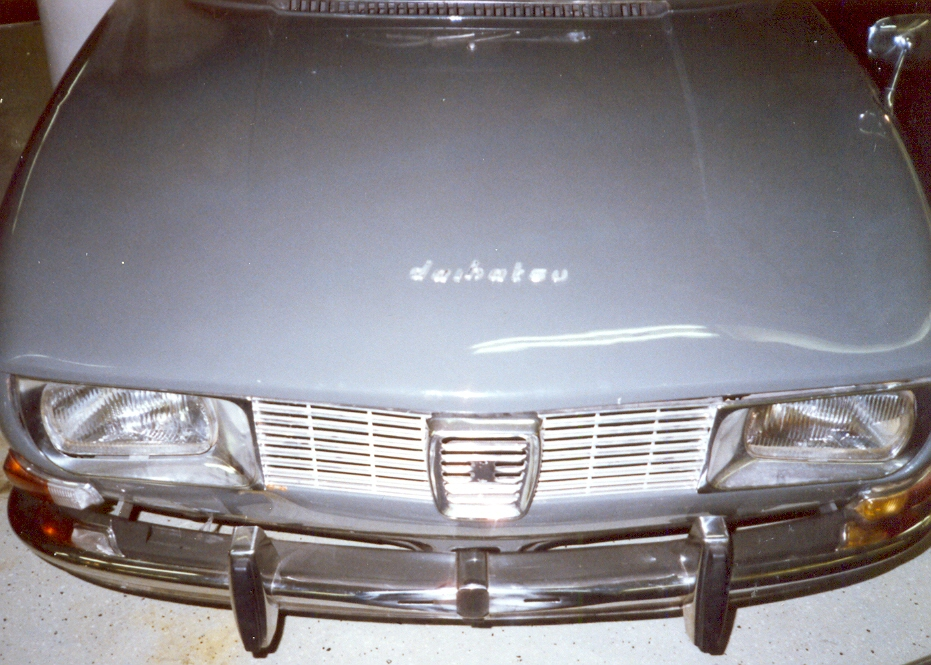
Project Gudmund with "daihatsu" label

The 99 was not only built in Saab's own Trollhättan Assembly - some variants were built by the Finnish Valmet Automotive in Uusikaupunki from 1969 onwards; the last five years of this production (1979–1984) was alongside the Finnish built version of the Talbot Horizon, which shared a similar high quality velour upholstery to the 99.

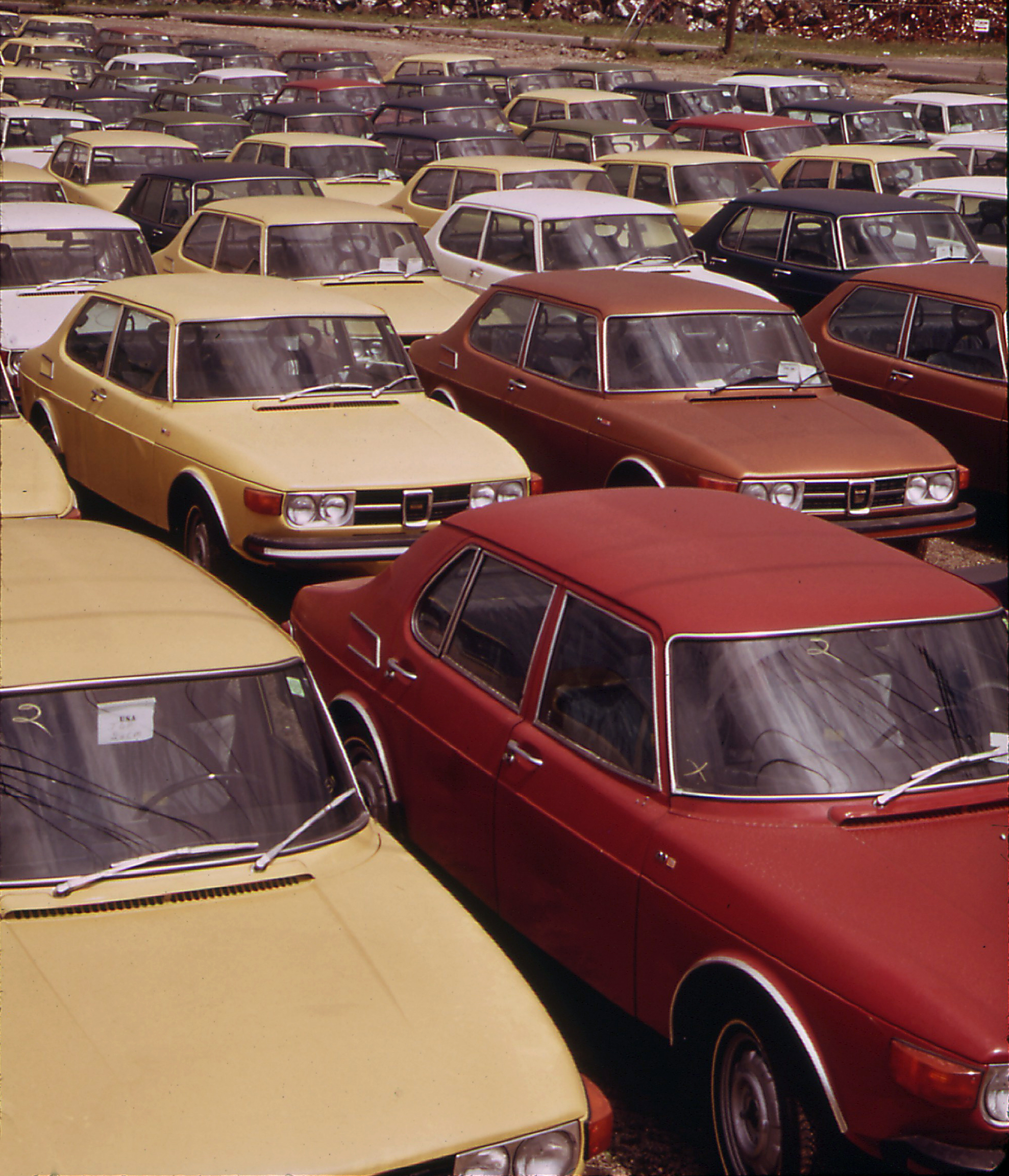
US-specification Saab 99s on the dock in Providence, Rhode Island (1973)

Although Saab engineers liked the company's existing two-stroke engine, it was decided that a four-stroke engine was necessary, and the choice was a 1.7 L (later 1.85 L) engine from Triumph. This was the same Triumph Slant-4 engine used in the Triumph Dolomite, but the Saab version was fitted with a Zenith-Stromberg CD carburetor developed specially for Saab. A number of Saab 99s were equipped with a Triumph Stag V8, but the V8 was later dropped in favour of a turbocharged unit which later powered the 99 Turbo.

A three-door estate version was planned from the start, but never made it into production. In 1971 (with thoughts about a combi coupé) the work on an estate was restarted, this time as a five-door.

== Description and reception ==
The first engine used in the original 99 was a four-cylinder inline engine which was tilted at 45 degrees. The 1709 cc Triumph-sourced engine produced 87 PS (64 kW; 86 hp) SAE gross at 5500 rpm. The engine was conventionally water-cooled, but unlike most cars of the time it had an electric cooling fan.

Triumph soon upgraded the engine to 1.85 L; the appearance in February 1971 of the four-door Saab 99 (99CM4 series) coincided with the adoption of the new, bored-out, 1854 cc unit. Saab experienced reliability problems with the Triumph-sourced engines and decided to bring the design in-house. From September 1972 the 1985 cc Saab B engine was used. During the lifetime of the 99 model, several subsequent engine developments took place, including the incorporation of fuel injection for some versions.

The 99 was front-wheel-drive, its engine being fitted in a reverse longitudinal position similar to other pre-transverse engine designs like the Citroën Traction Avant, orienting the clutch (or output) towards the front to place the weight of the engine behind the gearbox to avoid nose heaviness. Drive to the under-mounted gearbox was by triplex chain. Front-wheel-drive was still a relatively uncommon configuration at the time of the 99's introduction, although traditional in Saabs.

The bonnet (hood) was front-hinged and the panel extended over the front wheel-arches. The windscreen (windshield) was 'wrap-around' and very deep for the era. The A-pillar had a steep angle, providing excellent driver visibility. The drag coefficient was 0.37 while other cars of the time had 0.4 to 0.5. The chassis was also designed for passive safety, with deformation zones front and rear.

Due to the American sealed beam headlamp requirement in place at the time, the USA models had a special front fascia with four round headlights instead of the two rectangular units it had in other markets. The "US front" then became an item for car customisers in Europe, and vice versa.

Early 99s carried over the freewheel transmission from the Saab 96, but the freewheel was removed with the introduction of the 1.85 L engine, likely on account of the extra power that the apparatus would have to transmit. The handbrake was on the front wheels.

The 99 was Saab's last factory rally car, first in EMS guise and later as the Turbo version. The Saab 99 Turbo was one of the first 'family cars' to be fitted with a turbo after the 1962-63 Oldsmobile Turbo Jetfire; other contemporary turbocharged automobiles were 'specialised' vehicles and were difficult to drive. Popular Mechanics lists the Saab 99 Turbo as number two on its Top Ten list of turbocharged cars of all time.

The UK's "Mass Motorist" magazine (1968) summarised their view of the 99 as follows: "That the 99 is comfortable, well-made, satisfying to drive and well-equipped ought to mean that other makers should take heed. The BMW 2002 and Alfa Romeo Giulia are the SAAB 99's main rivals. I would contend here that SAAB has the advantage of them, and should SAAB choose to fit an even more powerful motor, the 99 could be a class leader in a short space of time."

Australia's Wheels magazine wrote in a July 1978 road test of the 99 Turbo, "Compare the top-gear times and you'll see that the Turbo is almost as fast between 60 km/h (37 mph) and 160 km/h (99 mph) in fourth gear as any five-seater in the world". Modern Motor of August 1978 wrote; "It is necessary to drive the car to believe that such a seemingly endless surge of strong acceleration is possible from a 2.0 L engine in a far from lightweight car".

Popular Science wrote "It's in the Peugeot/Volvo price class, but in the Colt/Dasher fuel-economy class; and the little four-cylinder overhead-cam engine gives this car V8 agility" and "No American made engine since 1968 can compare with this kind of driveability, and earlier ones are still not equal to the Saab"

A police version of the 99 was also built. The hood/bonnet of the 99 (and also the 900) caused problems for the police livery team. Since it wraps around, covering the wheel arches, the paint had to be extended up onto the hood panel and not restricted to just the fenders as on other cars.

The Saab 99 (saloon model) featured a heating duct leading to the rear window - a lever between the front seats controlled the de-fogging airflow. The 99 featured a floor-located ignition switch which also locked the gear stick (rather than the steering wheel). This arrangement required drivers to select reverse gear before the ignition key could be removed.

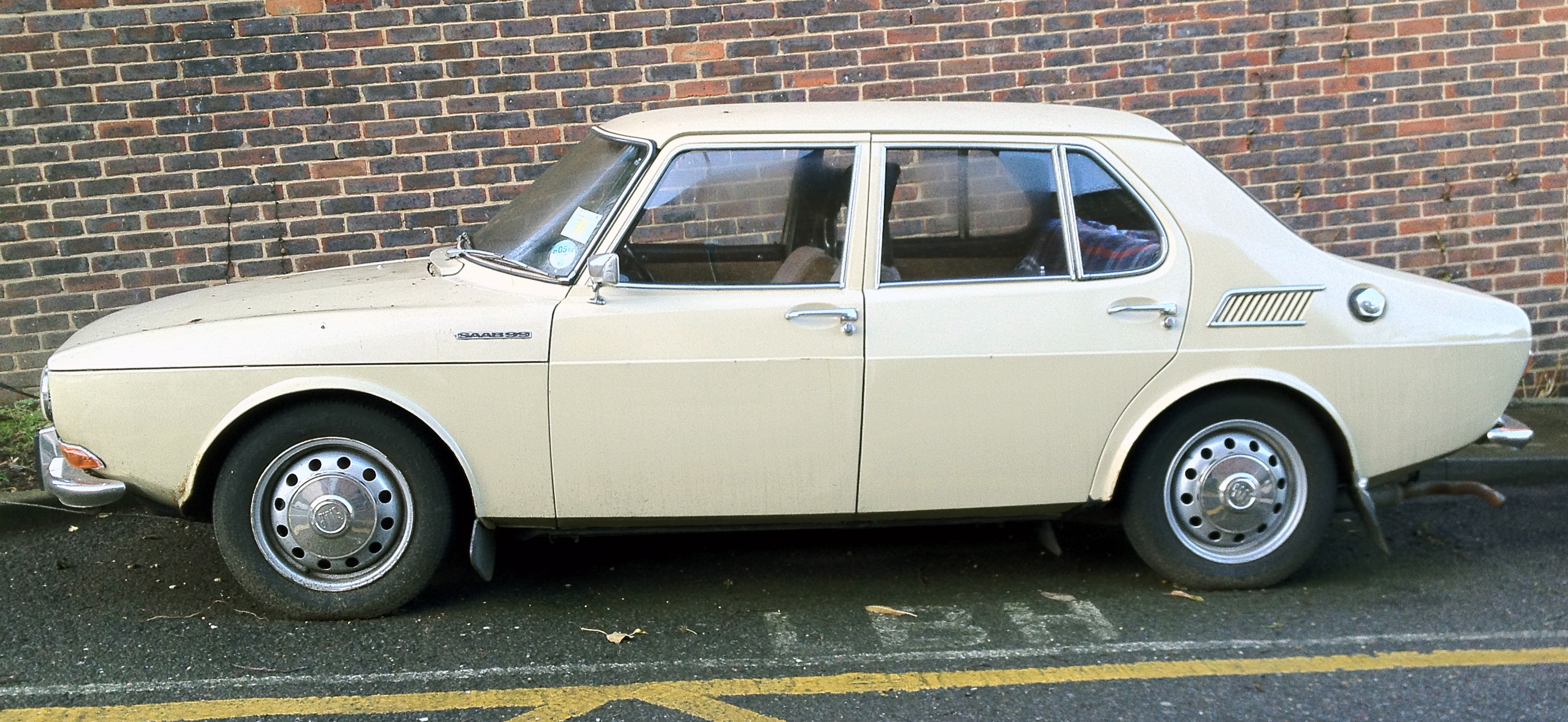
1970 Saab 99 four-door saloon (side view)

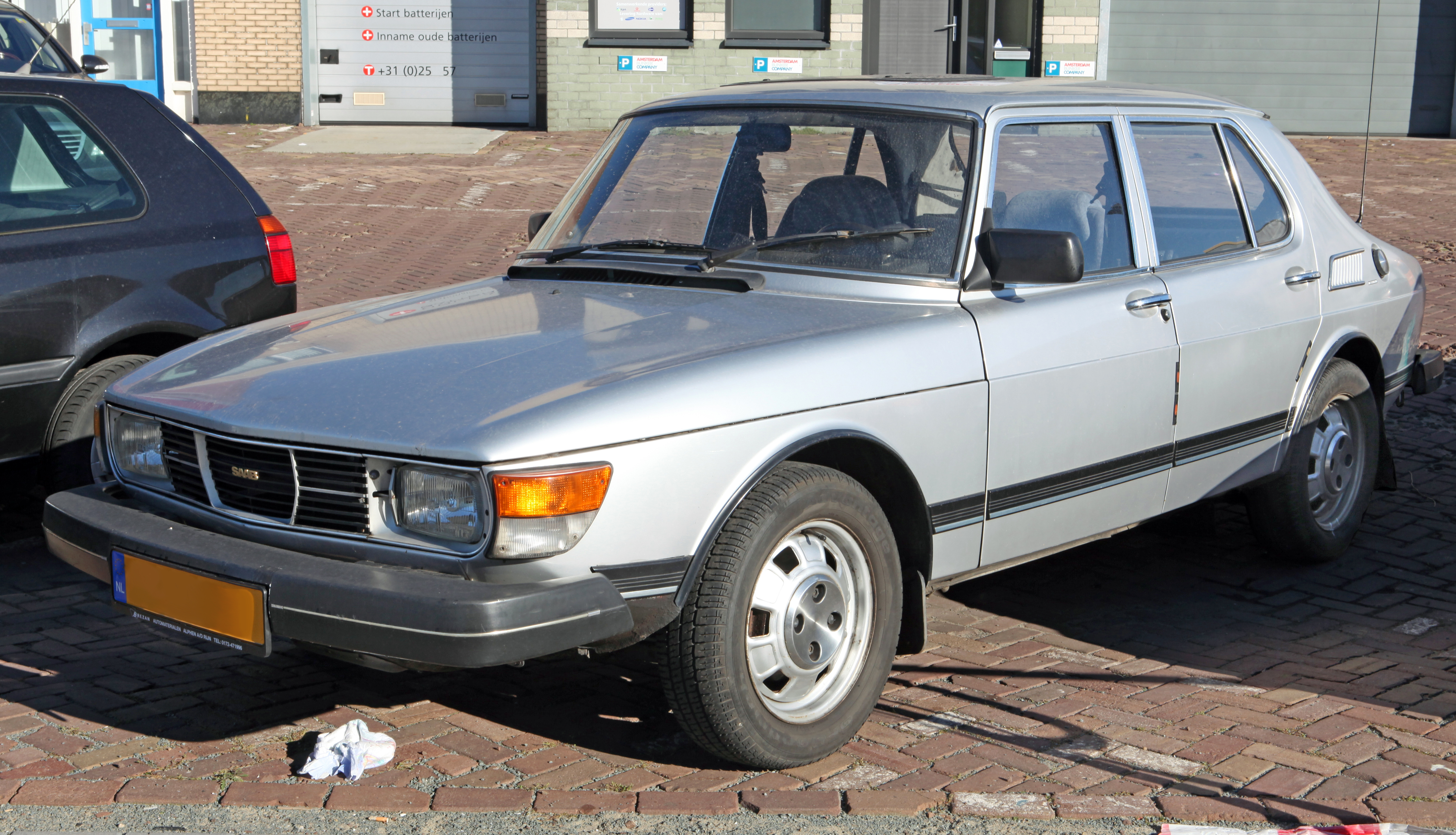
1982 Saab 99 four-door saloon

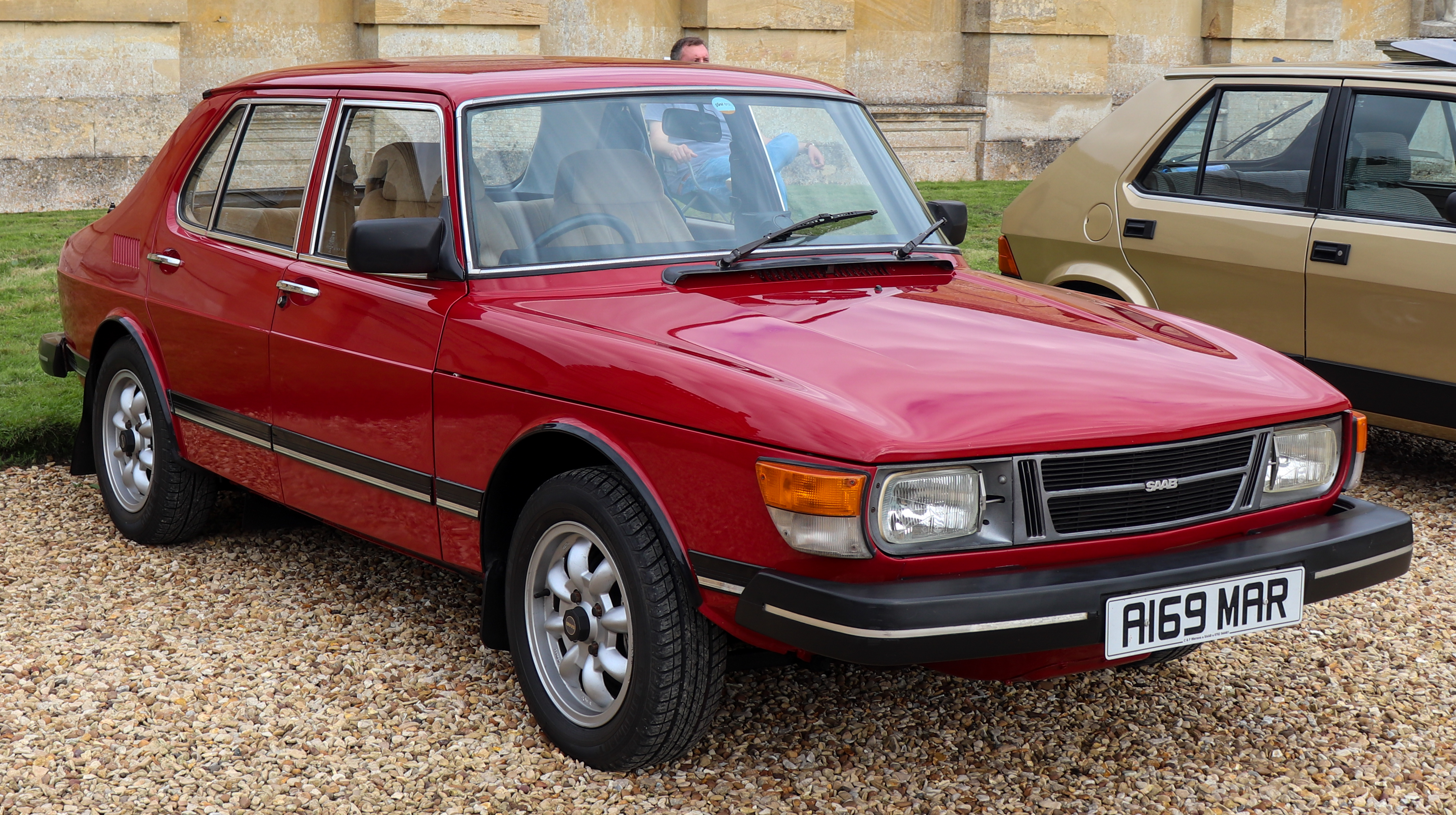
1983 Saab 99 GL (facelift; radiator grille was similar to the Saab 900)

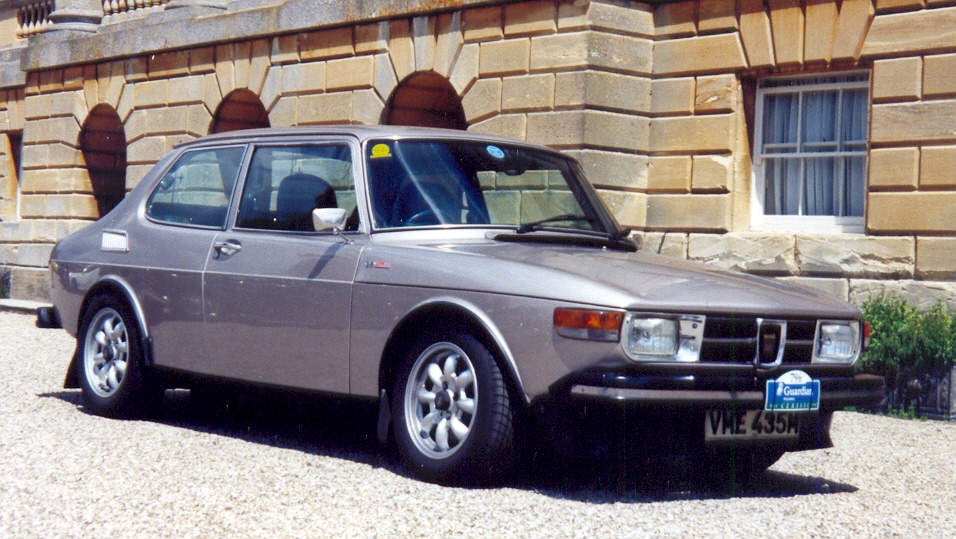
UK-spec 1974 Saab 99 EMS

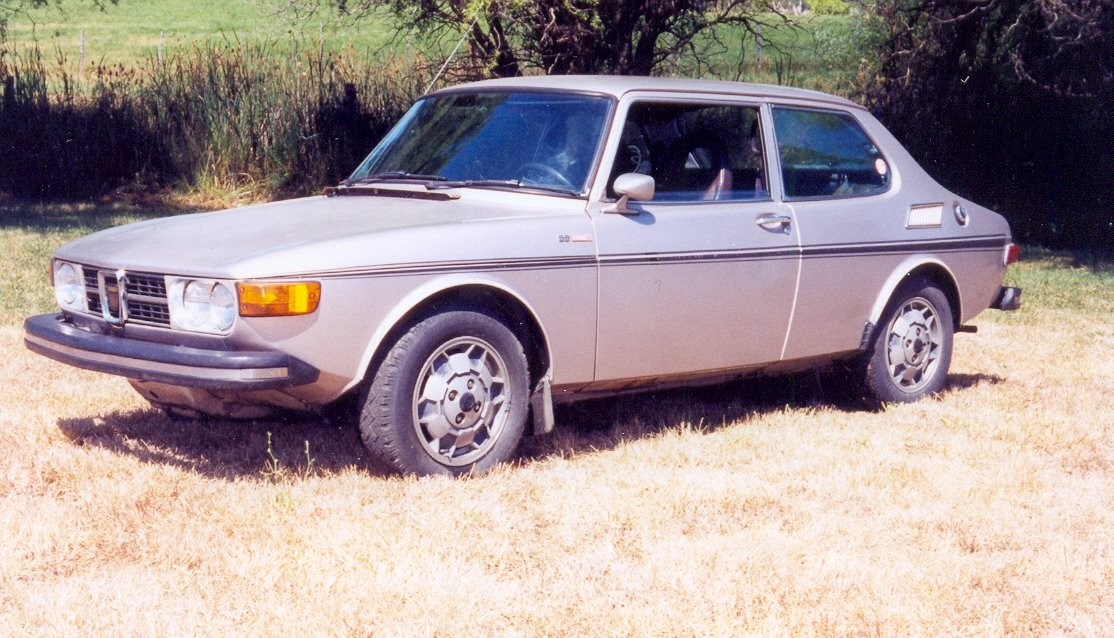
US-spec 1974 Saab 99 EMS

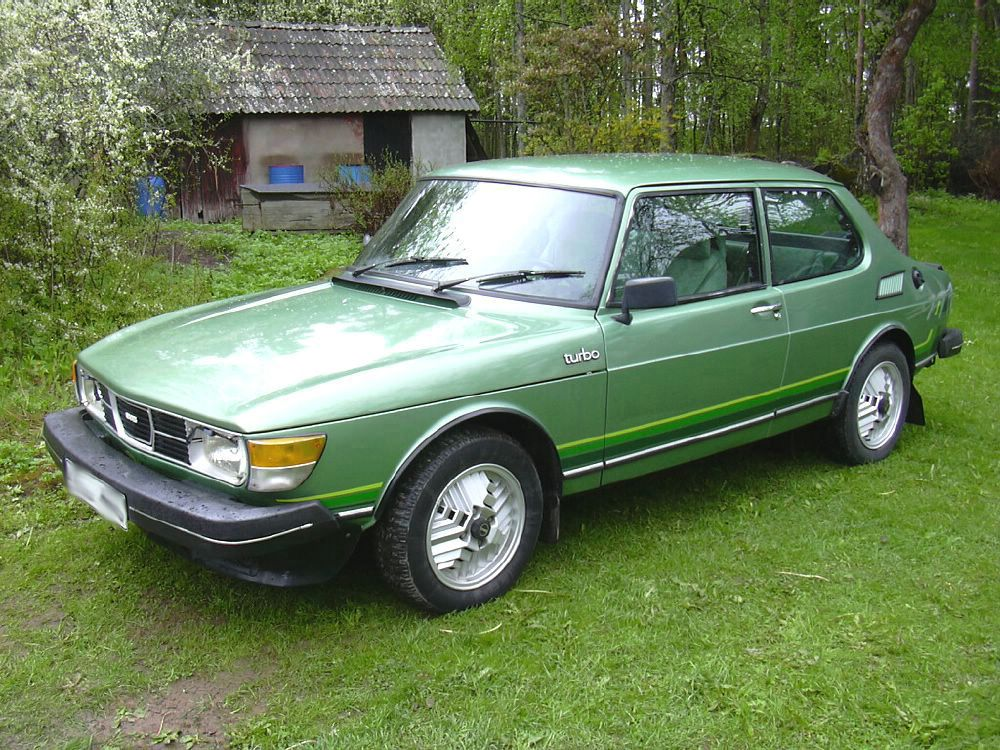
Saab 99 Turbo with 'inca' wheels

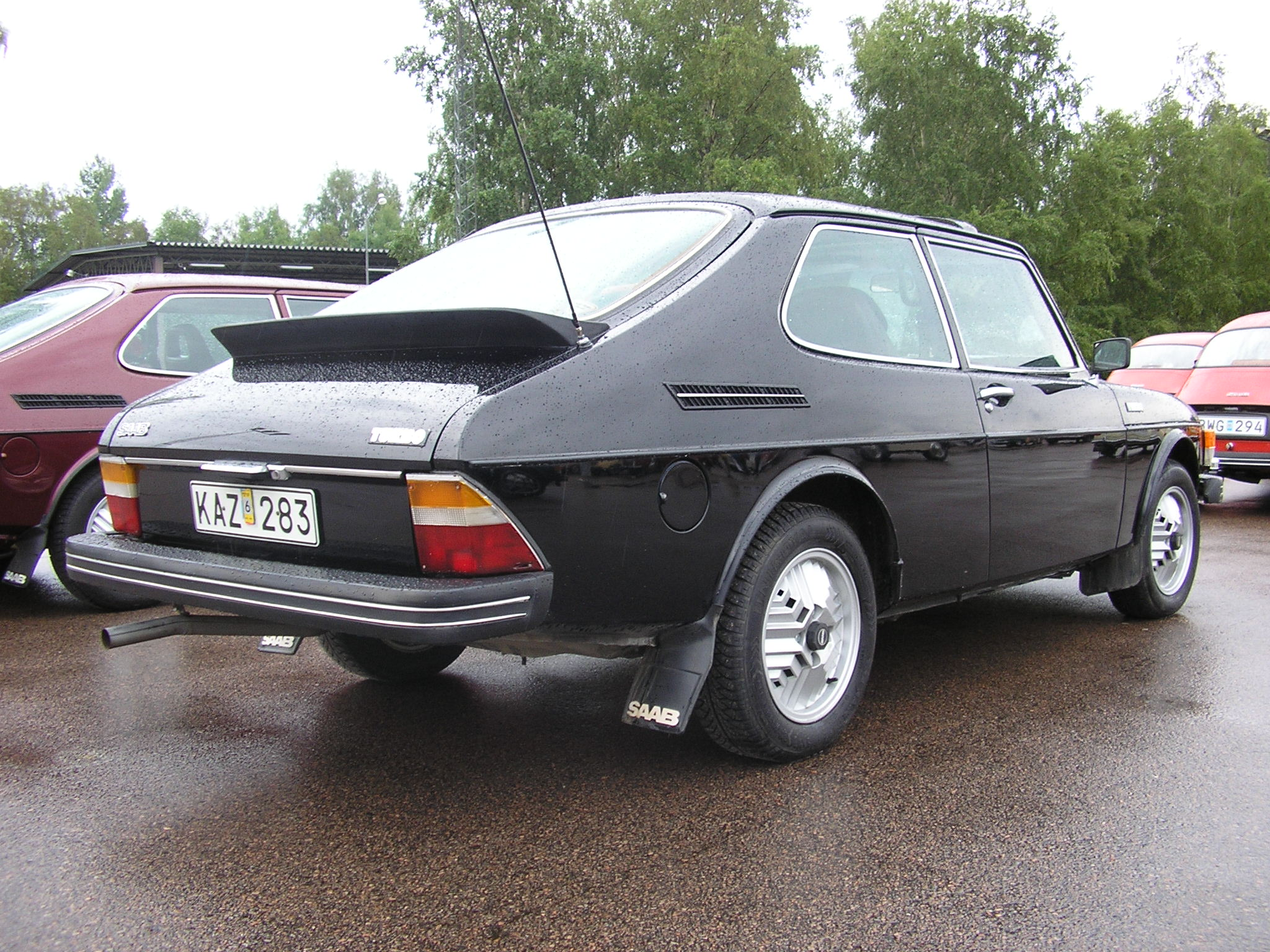
1978 Saab 99 Turbo with combi coupé bodywork

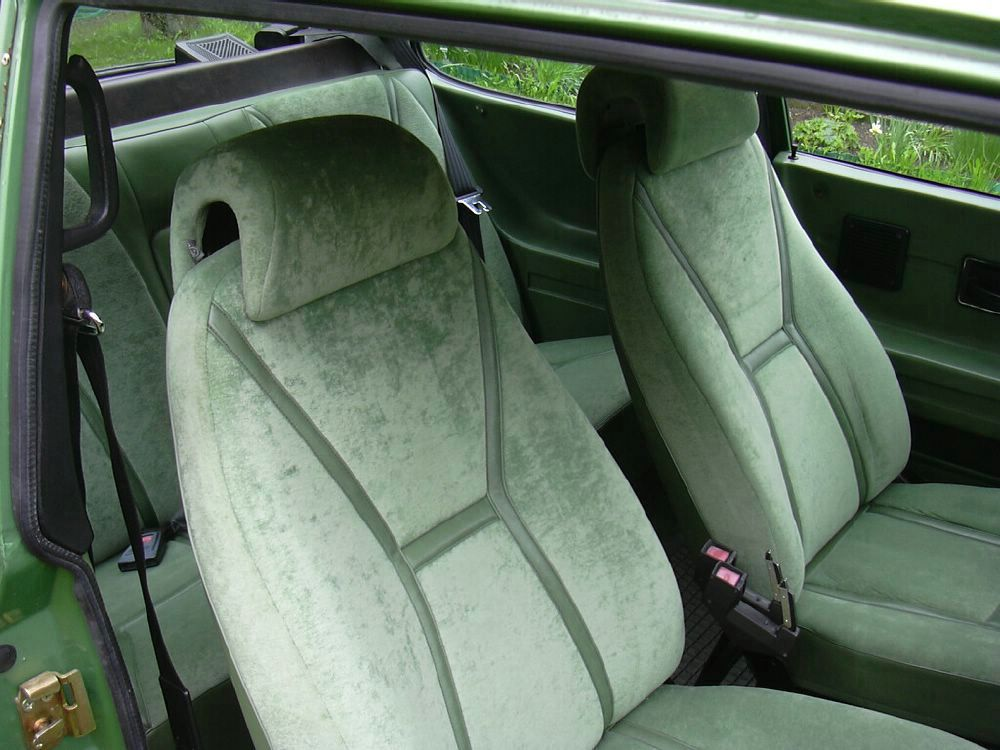
99 Turbo-specific seats

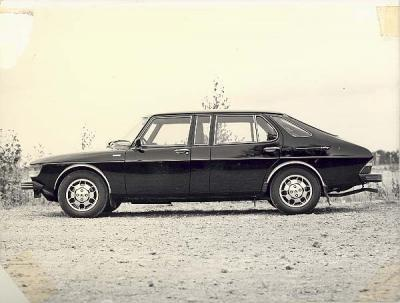
The first factory stretched Saab 99 'Finlandia' limousine

== Models ==
- E —Introduced for 1970 (available by order, not from the dealer floor), the 99E (Electronic fuel injection, four-speed manual) was originally only available in a two-door version. The 99 E had the 1709 cc engine displacement Triumph engine giving 87 PS (64 kW) thanks to Bosch Type-D Jetronic fuel injection instead of the Zenith-Stromberg carburetors. The original carbureted engine produced 80 PS (59 kW). Fuel consumption was 7.8 L/100 km (33 mpg) at 105–110 km/h (65-70 mph).
- EMS—Introduced in 1972, the EMS (Electronic fuel injection Manual transmission Special) was a sportier model that was originally only available in a two-door version. Engine was equipped from 1972 to 1974 with Bosch D-Jetronic and from 1975 on with Bosch K-Jetronic mechanical fuel injection. Despite the fuel system change, letter "e" was kept in model name. In 1977 the EMS became available in the three-door 'wagonback' body that was introduced for standard models in 1974 (1978 in the USA). It had a stiffer suspension and was sold in yellow or a copper coral metallic paint in 1973, Sterling Silver or Sunset orange in 1974, black or Sterling silver in 1975 and 1976, black, Sterling silver, or Cardinal red in 1977, and Sterling silver or Cardinal red in 1978. The new Swedish-built engine had 1985 cc displacement giving 110 PS (81 kW; 108 hp) and a top speed of 170 km/h (106 mph). The grille badge differed from the more basic models in 1973 and 1974 only. Other features through the years included quicker steering, luxury interior, soccerball wheels, carpeted trunk, and front air dam.
- SSE—Sold in the US to satisfy demand while the EMS was not yet available there. The SSE had a black or burled walnut vinyl roof cover, a BorgWarner automatic transmission and a 1.85-litre Triumph engine.
- X7—Introduced in 1973. A very basic model only sold in Sweden and Denmark. The car had no self-repairing bumpers and it also had the same seats as the V4 Saabs, although these did not include electric heating elements. A simpler heating and ventilation system was also installed. The clock, cigarette lighter, glove compartment and the rear window defogger were also dropped.
- L—Luxe. A budget model introduced in 1973 that came with the 1.85 L engine.
- LE—Equipped with the same fuel-injected engine as the EMS; unknown what years it was produced (at least from 1974).
- GL—Grand Luxe.
- GLE—Grand Luxe with E for INJECTION not executive, introduced in 1976. This was the top model, equipped with fuel injection, power steering (in some markets), and an automatic transmission.
- GLs—Grand Luxe Super. It was the same as a GL but with two carburetors instead of one. It had 108 PS (79 kW; 107 hp) compared to the 100 PS (74 kW; 99 hp) in the single-carburetor version.
- Turbo—Introduced in 1978, although 100 pre-series cars were built in 1977. The 99 Turbo was fitted with a turbocharged version of the 2-litre engine. The body was originally a 3-door combi coupé version but later in 1979-80 the company produced a two-door model, which was a limited homologation exercise to enable the production of a rally car. It was available in Cardinal red, Sterling silver, Anthracite grey, and Black; the two-door was available in silver, cardinal red and metallic green. The Turbo S was a special model with factory-mounted water injection, giving an extra 15–20 PS. In 1978 there was a very limited edition of a little over 100 five-door 99 Turbos. They were only available in Cardinal red.
- Finlandia—A limousine version of the Saab 99 GLE combi coupé with a 25 centimetres (9.8 in) longer wheelbase was introduced in 1977 by Valmet in Uusikaupunki, Finland. The Swedish head office was not too fond of this model or the concept of making an executive car out of the 5-door combi coupe. And so it was only sold in Finland and never given an official designation by Trollhättan. It was available from local dealers as the Saab 99 "Finlandia". The first year had a short extension piece between the front and rear doors. In 1978 the wheelbase was slightly shortened to 20 centimetres (7.9 in) longer than in the standard model but arguably more elegant in execution. The elongation was done discreetly by adding 10 centimetres (3.9 in) to all four doors, however inside the change was distinct only in the backseat, with significantly increased rear legroom. Three late 99 Finlandias were fitted with turbocharged engines and manual transmissions at the factory.

These cars were inspired by a gift to the Finnish President Urho Kekkonen in the mid 1970's by the industrialist and personal friend Marcus Wallenberg Jr., who got the idea at a social function where Kekkonen had complained to him that he disliked his brash and extremely conspicuous Cadillac official state car in a normal setting. According to him, it was not appropriate transportation despite his status as it made him feel unduly elevated above the common people. Aside from an official state visit from abroad or visiting the embassies of superpowers like the Soviet Union or the United States, and other similar functions which necessitated maintaining a different kind of appearance, it was far too exuberant. In addition to which, it strongly stood out from normal Finnish traffic and everybody knew who was in it, making this an obvious security concern. Large luxurious American sedans were extremely rare at the time in Finland. Kekkonen did not have a driver's license and preferred to be chauffeured to his official business, but in an inconspicuous fashion. To cater to this, Wallenberg ordered a pine-green Saab 99 and had it elongated by 20 cm, by having 10 cm added to all the doors, at a Swedish coachbuilder in Malmö called Heiner's Mekaniska Verkstad. Wallenberg gifted the car to Kekkonen, who loved it. This was of course widely reported in the press and Finnish political and economic elite liked the idea to the point that Saab-Valmet felt necessary to start emulating the fashion endorsed by the nation's head of state. Kekkonen's original Wallenberg Special 99 is on display at the Uusikaupunki Automobile Museum, which also chronicles the history of Saab (and other makes) and the various specialized models developed as concept cars or manufactured at the Valmet factory. The tradition continued with the Saab 900 Finlandia in 1979, which was then from 1982 sold as the 900 CD with most ordered examples being 4 door-sedans, instead of 5 door combi coupés. One LWB 900 5D combi coupé aka "The last Saab Finlandia" was delivered to Finnish paper-mill giant Metsä Group in 1983.

- Petro-Multifuel engine designed to run on either gasoline or kerosene. Produced 1979–1981 in Uusikaupunki and only sold in Finland. Developed due raising fuel prices to be an alternative or replacement for a diesel engine which was missing from Saab's model line. Kerosene was not suitable for long-term reliability and cost savings evaporated due to changes in fuel pricing; most Petros were converted to run on gasoline exclusively.

=== Performance ===
- Saab 99E 1.85L 95 PS DIN (70 kW; 94 hp). Acceleration 0–100 km/h 14.6 sec. Top speed 161.5 km/h.
- Saab 99 EMS 118 PS DIN (87 kW; 116 hp). Acceleration 0–100 km/h 11.6 sec. 0–160 km/h 41.0 sec. Top speed 175.6 km/h.
- Saab 99 Turbo 145 PS DIN (107 kW; 143 hp). Acceleration 0–100 km/h 9.2 sec. 0–160 km/h 26.2 sec. Top speed 196.7 km/h. (U.S. 135 hp for 1978 only)
- Saab 99 Petro 85 PS DIN (63 kW; 84 hp). Acceleration 0–100 km/h 16.5 sec. Top speed 155 km/h (96 mph).

=== References ===
- Auto, motor und sport nr 4.4 0 60 24-1971 and nr 8–1979.

== History ==
The 99 was first shown on November 22, 1967. The first production cars came in autumn 1968, although only 4190 cars were built this year. Production increased considerably in 1969 and again in 1970 when the four-door model arrived. In 1970 the interior was also given a facelift and became more luxurious, with a new steering wheel. The exhaust system was now made of aluminum, engine mounts and drive joints were changed. In March, the 99E (also available with a three-speed automatic transmission) was introduced. It had a 1.75 L engine with electronically controlled fuel injection, giving 87 PS (64 kW; 86 hp). The 1970 99 was also the first passenger vehicle to be sold with the headlamp wipers in Swedish market as standard, two years before they became mandatory in Sweden.

In 1971 the 99 was given a larger and stronger engine, a 1.85 L engine giving 86 PS (63 kW; 85 hp) on the carbureted model and 95 PS (70 kW; 94 hp) for the fuel-injected model. The 1.75 L engine was now only available with a carburetor. Saab also introduced headlight wipers, as well as larger rear-view mirrors and an additional air inlet beneath the existing grille. The dashboard was given a redesign along with new instruments.

In 1972 the 1.75 L engine was no longer available. The power of the engine was increased to 88 PS (65 kW; 87 hp) for carbureted models and 97 PS (71 kW; 96 hp) for fuel-injected models. The 2.0 L engine became available. The major change this year were new plastic bumpers that could take impacts up to 8 km/h (5 mph) and still retain their shape. The suspension was stiffened and received stronger dampers. An electrically heated driver's seat was also introduced. In January 1972 the 99 EMS (Electronic-Manual-Special) was introduced. It was a sportier model that was originally only available in a two-door version; but became available in the wagonback body beginning in 1974 (Europe). It had stiffer suspension and also silver or copper ('bronze')-colored metallic paint as option. The engine had 1985 cc displacement and Bosch D-Jetronic electronic fuel injection giving 110 PS (81 kW; 108 hp) and a top speed of 170 km/h (106 mph).

For the United States, a special 99 SSE was developed to satisfy demand while the EMS was not yet available there. The SSE had a black or burled walnut vinyl roof cover and an automatic transmission (by Borg-Warner). It also had the 1.85 L Triumph engine installed.

In 1973 a low-cost model called the 99L was introduced. It was a two-door with a 1.85 L engine giving 88 PS (65 kW; 87 hp). All other models had the Swedish-built 2.0 L engine, which produces 95 PS (70 kW) in carburetted form. The LE model had electronic fuel injection giving 110 PS (81 kW; 108 hp). The LE model was mainly made for export. The inner ceiling was changed, as were protective bars in the doors, and a new black grille. In Northern Europe, a de-contented model called the 99 X7 was also marketed.

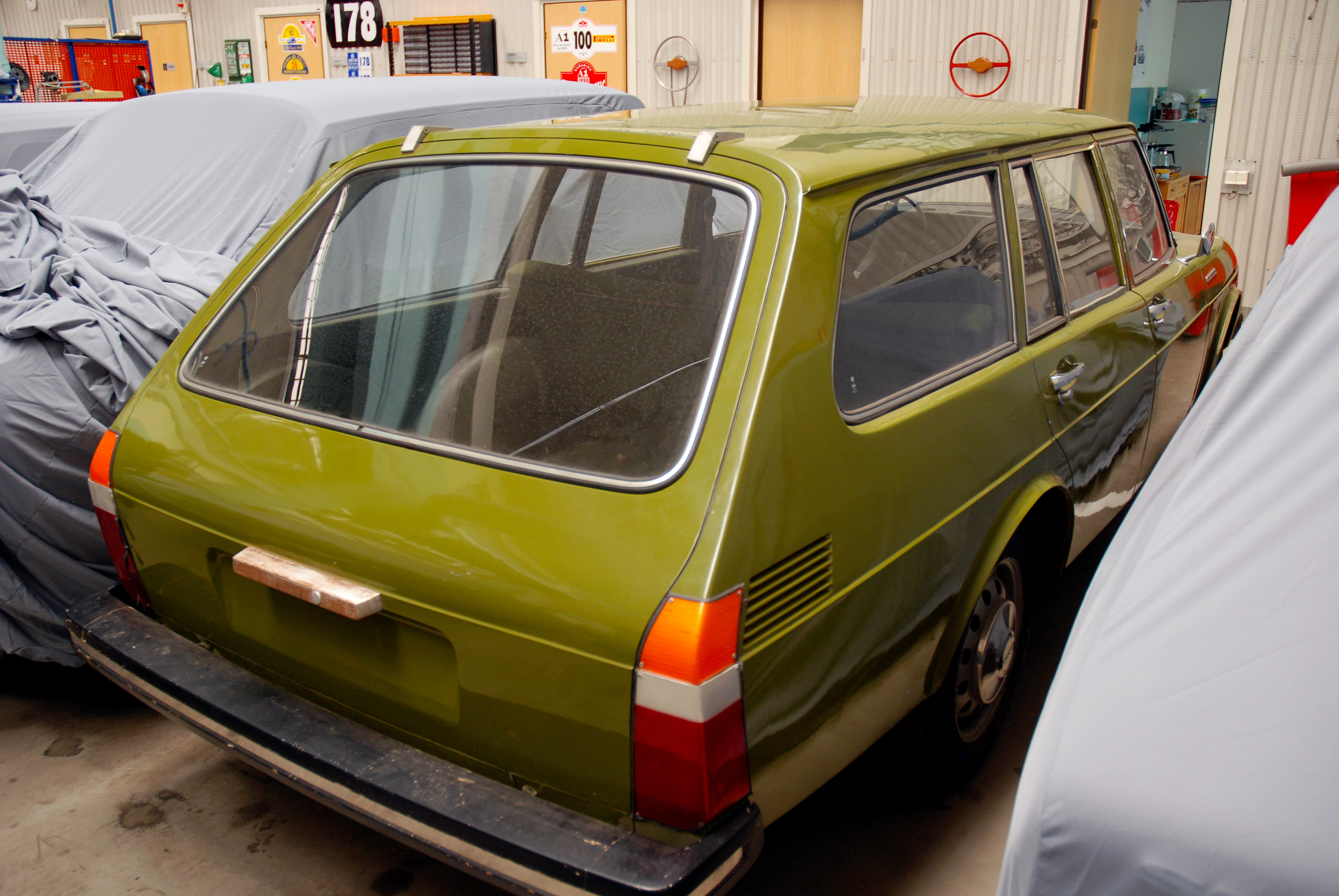
In 1971 a five-door estate version was prototyped, but preference was given to a three-door hatchback, the "combi coupé" launched in 1974.

In January 1974 the three-door hatchback combi coupé (marketed as a "Wagon Back" in the USA) was introduced. It was 11 cm (4.3 in) longer than the sedan. Front seats and steering wheel were new for 1974, while the EMS received an all-new, model-specific interior. Inertial reel belts were also fitted.

In 1975 the brakes were improved and the hand brake now worked directly on the primary brake pads instead of on separate pads acting as drum brakes inside the brake rotor. The 99 was now available in two versions, one with a carburetor with 100 PS (74 kW; 99 hp) and a fuel-injected version using Bosch K-Jetronic fuel injection system giving 118 PS (87 kW; 116 hp). In February a model using Zenith-Stromberg 150CDS(E) dual carburetors was introduced. It was only available for the combi coupé and has 108 PS (79 kW; 107 hp). The combi coupé had been fitted with a unique grille in 1974; this was now applied across the range.

In 1976 nothing major was changed, but a self-adjusting clutch was introduced. The engines were adapted for tougher emissions requirements and several models with an electrically heated rear window were introduced. A luxurious 4-door sedan model was available, the 99 GLE. it came with power steering, an automatic transmission, a fuel-injected engine, luxurious upholstery on the seats and an armrest in the rear seat. The five-door combi coupé model was also introduced.

In 1977, the front light clusters and the sedan's tail lights were enlarged. The rubber strips on the bumpers were changed. The "One Hundred series" of test-fleet Turbo cars were distributed around the world. The cars were mainly made from three- and two-door EMS models, but a few four-door and even five-door cars were also made. The four- and five-door models were tested by mostly police in Sweden, Finland and Switzerland.

In 1978 a turbocharged version of the car, the 99 Turbo, was introduced. It was only available as a combi coupé until the next year. The turbocharged two-liter engine produced 145 PS (107 kW; 143 hp) giving the car a top speed of 200 km/h (124 mph). The turbochargers were designed and built by Garrett AiResearch. In terms of appearance, it received distinctive alloy wheels and front and rear spoilers. The 99 Turbo repositioned Saab in the car market and it came to be regarded as an iconic and technologically significant model of its era. By early 1979, over 10,000 turbo-engined Saabs had already been built, as Saab successfully entered a new market segment. Other news for 1978 included the availability of a sunroof, and the EMS became a three-door combi coupé in some markets.

In 1979 the combi coupé option was discontinued for the 99, as the new Saab 900 was only available in this bodystyle. The 99 Turbo changed over to the two-door saloon bodywork although only a small number were built. The rear axle was altered, the fuel tank changed to a plastic one, new wheels were fitted, and four-door models received new bumpers similar to those of the 900. These bumpers were also installed on two-doors beginning with the 1980 model year. In 1980 the 99 was also given the new and safer seats from the Saab 900, as well as low-mounted protective strips along the sides. The spare wheel was changed to an emergency unit. The carpeting, which had been changed to rubber a few years earlier, went back to textile. In the Swedish market the twin-carb version made a return for a single year, sold as the 99 Super and only available with four doors and an automatic transmission.

In 1981 the twin-carb Super was discontinued, although the 99 did gain a new engine option in its stead: the 99 GL with 100 PS (74 kW; 99 hp) was joined by the 99 GLi with 118 PS (87 kW; 116 hp), both with four-speed manual transmissions. The GLi was a bit more luxurious and had power side mirrors. It was only sold in Northern Europe and only around 1600 were built. All 99s received a new rear seat, velour upholstery, new rear mirrors, a new steering wheel, and the 900's front axle.

In 1982 came the H engine, built by Scania at Södertälje, making it possible for all cars to run on 93 octane gasoline. The two- and four-door 99 GLs were now available with a five-speed manual transmission. The window surround trim was blacked out and the wheels were new.

In 1983 a number of smaller technical and cosmetic changes were made, including a new grille similar to that of the 900 and blacked out B-pillars on two-door models. Brake pads were now asbestos-free. Five-speed-equipped 99s received low-resistance tires, which sit on wider 5½-inch rims, requiring moving the rear axle. Some further minor changes took place for 1984, including electronic ignition, lowered seats, and a more upright steering wheel. Five-speed cars also received interval wipers. This was to be the final year for the 99. It was replaced by the Saab 90 and the Saab 900.

A total of 588,643 were made; this total rises to 614,003 if Saab 90 production is included.

== WRC victories ==
No.	Event	Season	Driver	Co-driver	Car
1	(Sweden) 27th International Swedish Rally	1977	(Sweden) Stig Blomqvist	(Sweden) Hans Sylván	Saab 99 EMS
2	(Sweden) 29th International Swedish Rally	1979	(Sweden) Stig Blomqvist	(Sweden) Björn Cederberg	Saab 99 Turbo

== Production ==
Year	Production	Year	Production
1967	25	1976	72,819
1968	4190	1977	60,316
1969	19,411	1978	45,851
1970	29,755	1979	22,443
1971	35,136	1980	17,108
1972	45,001	1981	13,381
1973	52,065	1982	20,006
1974	62,637	1983	17,187
1975	64,167	1984	7,145

== Literature ==
- Cole, Lance (2011). Saab 99 and 900: The Complete Story. Ramsbury, Wiltshire, UK: The Crowood Press. ISBN 1-84797-352-3.
