= Golden frog =

Golden frog or Gold frog may refer to:

== Amphibians ==
- Panamanian golden frog (Atelopus zeteki), a critically endangered toad species in the family Bufonidae endemic to Panama
- Brazilian gold frog (Brachycephalus didactylus), a tiny frog in the family Brachycephalidae, endemic to Brazil
- Golden frog (Hylarana aurantiaca), a frog in the family Ranidae found in the Western Ghats of India and in Sri Lanka
- Eastern golden frog (Pelophylax plancyi), a frog in the family Ranidae found in northeastern China
- Golden poison frog (Phyllobates terribilis), a poison dart frog in the family Dendrobatidae endemic to the Pacific coast of Colombia
- Golden rocket frog (Anomaloglossus beebei), a frog in the family Aromobatidae, endemic to Kaieteur National Park in Guyana
- Supatá golden frog, (Ranitomeya sp. nov. “Supatáe”), a species of poison dart frog endemic to Colombia

== Other uses ==
- Golden Frog, an award for best cinematography from Camerimage
- "The Golden Frog", a short story in Señor Saint by Leslie Charteris
- "The Golden Frog", an episode of The Saint

== See also ==
- Golden coquí (Eleutherodactylus jasperi), a rare and possibly extinct frog in the family Eleutherodactylidae from Puerto Rico
- Golden mantella (Mantella aurantiaca), a small terrestrial frog in the family Mantellidae native to Madagascar
- Golden toad (Bufo periglenes), a small toad in the family Bufonidae from Costa Rica
- Frog (disambiguation)
