= Saab Toad =

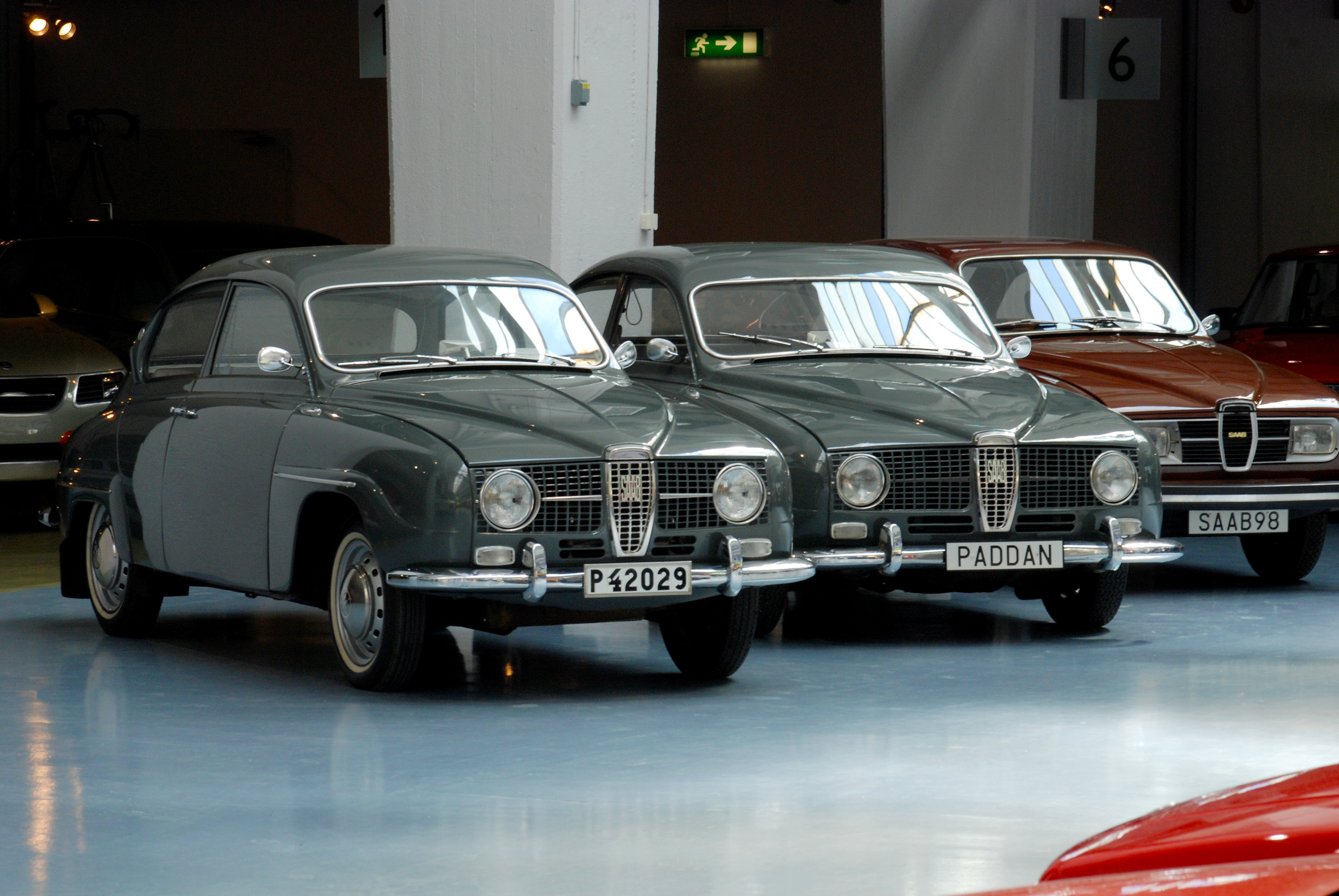
Saab Paddan (right) next to a regular Saab 96 (left), showing the difference in width.

The Saab Toad, or Paddan in Swedish, was a development car Saab Automobile made in 1966 to test out the new chassis, drive train and engine for the Saab 99.

== Background ==
On 2 April 1964, Gudmund's day in Sweden, after several years of planning, the Saab board started Project Gudmund. (Note: Digital sources often (wrongly) cite 1965.) This was a project to develop a new and larger car to replace the Saab 96. This new car became the Saab 99, designed by Sixten Sason, and unveiled in Stockholm on 22 November 1967.

== Overview ==
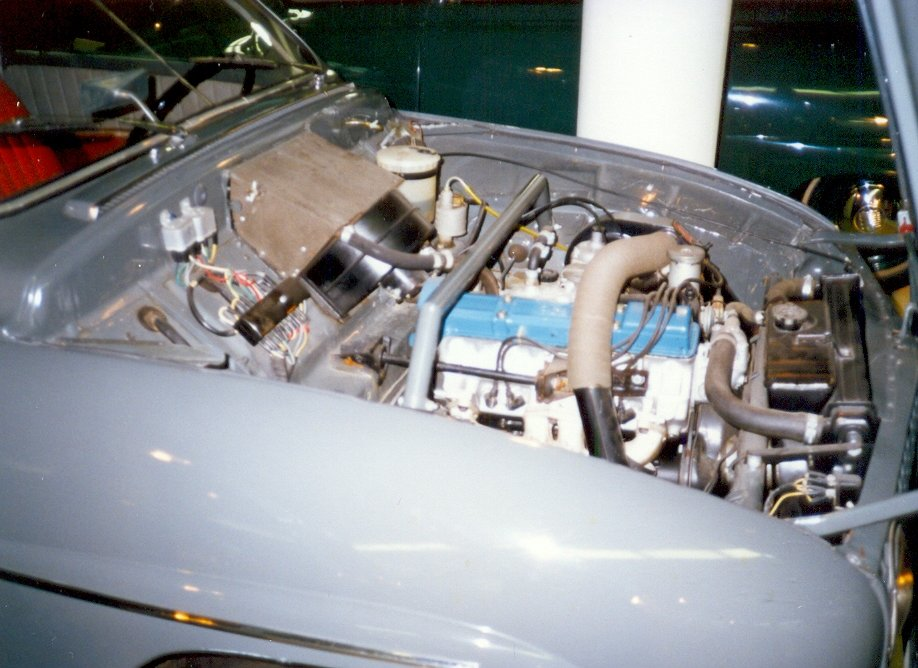
SAAB Paddan with in-line four fitted

The reason for this project was to preserve secrecy during development of the new model, the Saab 99, which was the company's first radically new body shape since the first cars made in 1947. The Toad used the body of a Saab 96, which was long enough for the purpose but had to be widened by 20 centimetres (7.9 in). This was achieved by cutting the body in half lengthwise and inserting 20 cm of steel spacer. The windscreen (windshield) and rear window clearly showed the seam.

The bonnet (hood) and grille required widening in a different way, to prevent changing the appearance of the centrally-placed features, as the picture shows. Under the bonnet, the inline four engine for the future Saab 99 was mounted, developed by Triumph in coordination with Saab.

It was rightly believed that the wider body would not be noticed on Sweden's roads, where so many SAAB 96 cars were an everyday sight. This deception was successful, for a while, until test drivers allowed a grey Toad to be followed by a similarly-colored SAAB 96, making the different proportions obvious to any observer.

Four Saab Toads were made, but only one remains, in dark gray paintwork. It is currently on display in the SAAB museum in Trollhättan, Sweden.

== Post-Saab Toad ==
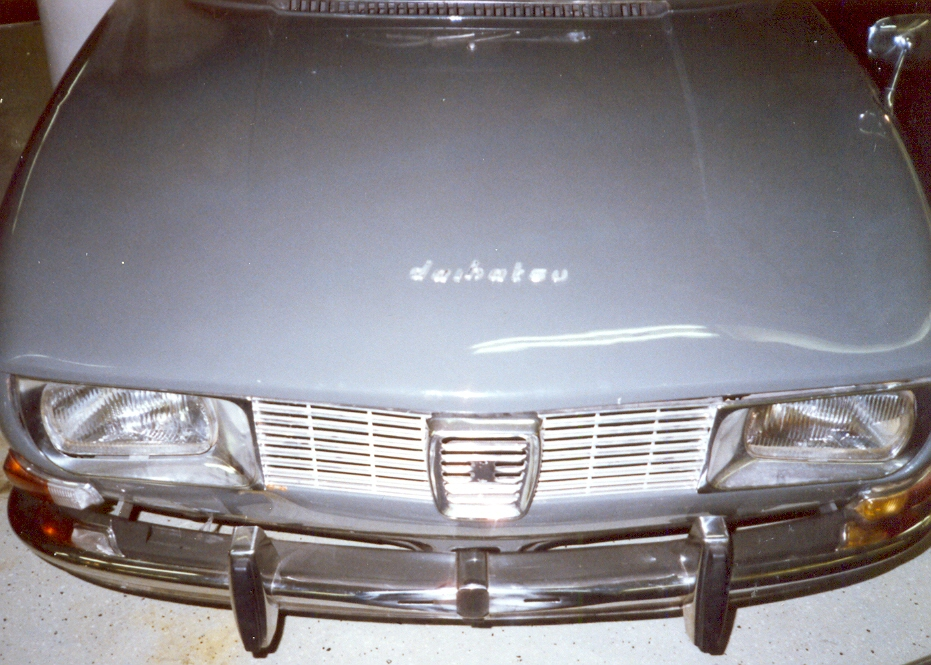
Project Gudmund with "Daihatsu" label

Further development was carried out on the SAAB Daihatsu, a test car with the new body but badged "Daihatsu", to prevent its identification by journalists as a developmental SAAB. This vehicle is on display in the SAAB Museum in Trollhättan.

== Literature ==
- Lindh, Bjorn-Eric (1987). SAAB, The First 40 Years of Saab Cars (1st ed.). Förlagshuset Noren AB. ISBN 91-86442-34-1.
