= Frog (dinghy) =

Class of sailing dinghy

Development
- Name: Frog

Hull
- Type: Monohull
- LOA: 7 ft 10 in (2.39 m)
- Beam: 4 ft (1.2 m)

Sails
- Upwind sail area: 40 sq ft (3.7 m^{2})

The Frog is a small dinghy with an approximate length of 7 ft 10 in (2.39 m) and an approximate beam of 4 ft (1.2 m). Its sprit and foresail rig has 40 square feet (4 m^{2}) of sail area.
