= Zenith Carburettor Company (British) =

British carburetor maker

Zenith Carburetter Company Limited
- Industry: Automotive manufacturing
- Founded: 1912; 114 years ago
- Headquarters: United Kingdom
- Parent: Société du carburateur Zénith

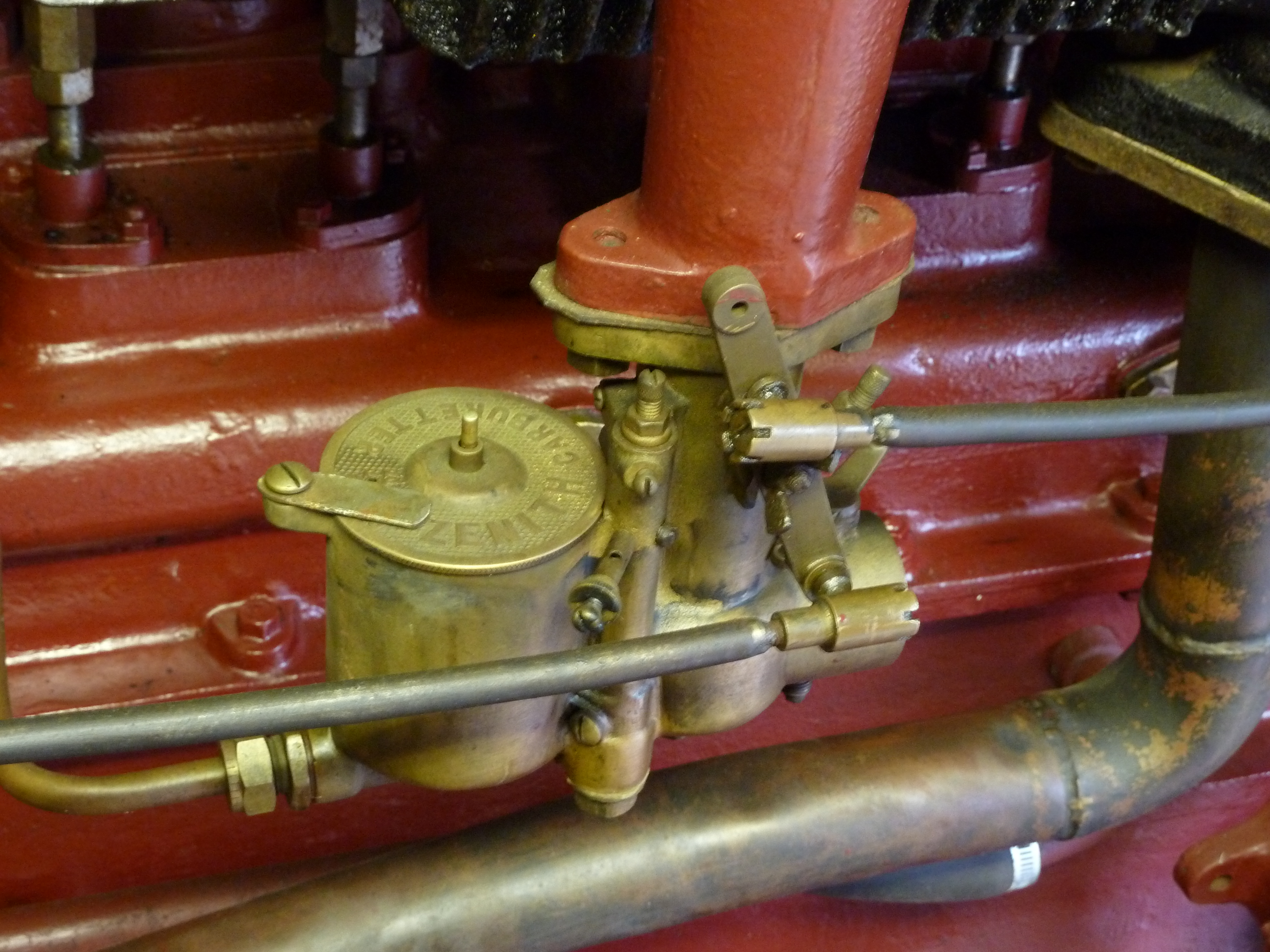
Brass Zenith semi-updraught carburettor, 1925

The Zenith Carburetter Company Limited was a British company making carburettors in Stanmore Middlesex, founded in 1912 as a subsidiary of the French Société du carburateur Zénith. In 1965, the company joined with its major pre-war rival Solex Carburettors, and over time, the Zenith brand name fell into disuse. The rights to the Zenith designs were owned by Solex UK (a daughter company of Solex in France).

While better known for its much later products, Zenith produced carburettors that were standard equipment on some early automobiles, for instance examples from the Edwardian era, including the Scripps-Booth.

== Products ==
Zenith's best-known products were the Zenith-Stromberg carburettors used from 1965–1967 Humber Super Snipe V, 1967–1975 Jaguar E-types, Saab 99s, 90s and early 900s, 1969–1972 Volvo 140s and 164s, 1966–1979 Hillman Hunter and derivatives, 1970–1981 Hillman Avenger, North American spec MGBs and MG Midgets, and some 1960s and 1970s Triumphs.

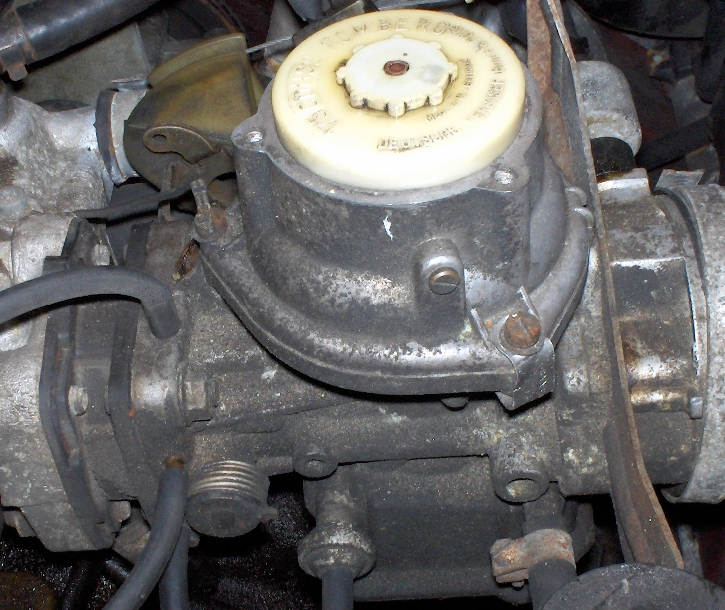
Non-UK German Pierburg (Stromberg) carburettor in a Saab 90

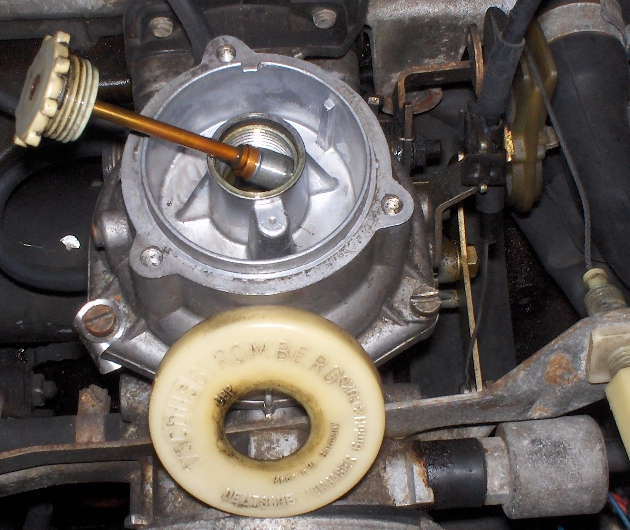
Non-UK German Pierburg (Stromberg) carburettor dashpot

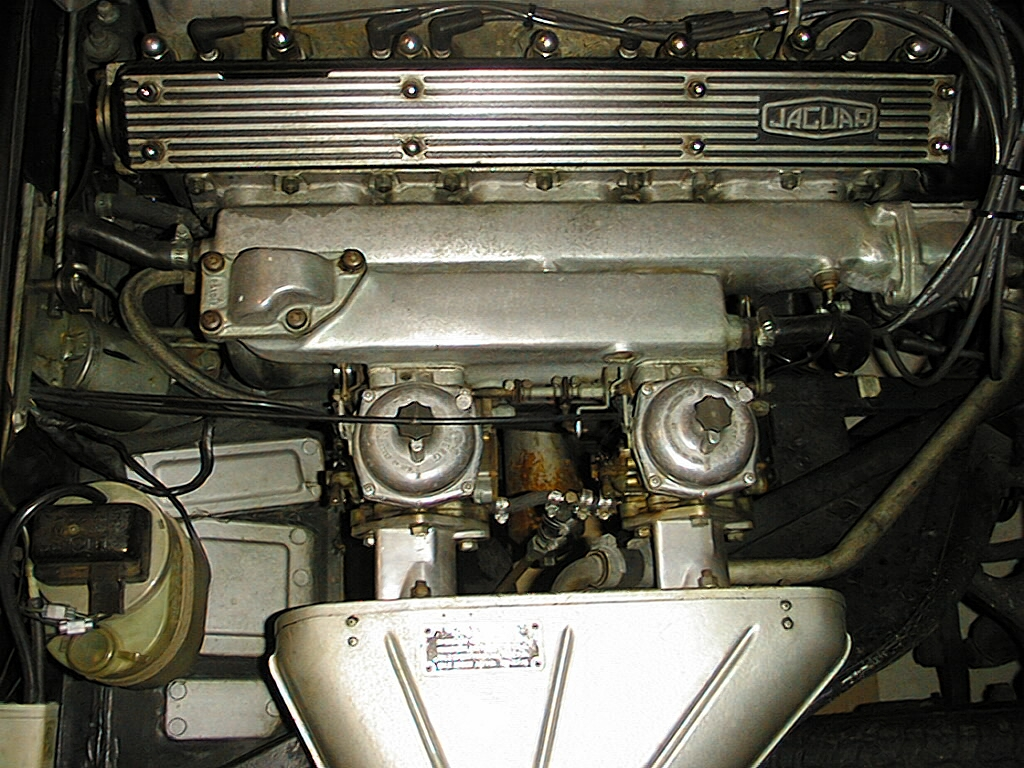
British made Zenith/Stromberg carburettors as installed on a 1969 Jaguar E-type 6cyl 4.2l engine

The Triumph Spitfire used Zenith IV carburettors in the North American market. In Australia, the CD-150 and CDS-175 models were fitted to the high-performance, triple-carburettored Holden Torana GTR-XU1.

Designed and developed by Dennis Barbet (Standard Triumph) and Harry Cartwright (Zenith) to break SU's patents, the Stromberg carburettor features a variable venturi controlled by a piston. This piston has a long, tapered, conical metering rod (usually referred to as a "needle") that fits inside an orifice ("jet") that admits fuel into the airstream at the venturi of the carburettor. Since the needle is tapered, as it rises and falls, it opens and closes the opening in the jet, regulating the passage of fuel, so the movement of the piston controls the amount of fuel delivered, depending on engine demand.

The flow of air through the venturi creates reduced static pressure within it. This pressure drop is communicated to the upper side of the piston via an air passage. The underside of the piston is in communication with atmospheric pressure. The difference in pressure between the two sides of the piston creates a force tending to lift the piston. Counteracting this force is the weight of the piston and the force of a compression spring that is compressed by the piston rising; because the spring is operating over a very small part of its possible range of extension, the spring force approximates to a constant force. Under steady state conditions, the upward and downward forces on the piston are equal and opposite, and the piston does not move.

If the airflow into the engine is increased – by opening the throttle plate, or by allowing the engine revolutions to rise with the throttle plate at a constant setting – the pressure drop in the venturi increases, the pressure above the piston falls, and the piston is sucked upward, increasing the size of the venturi, until the pressure drop in the venturi returns to its nominal level. Similarly, if the airflow into the engine is reduced, the piston will fall. The result is that the pressure drop in the venturi remains the same regardless of the speed of the airflow – hence the name "constant depression" for carburettors operating on this principle – but the piston rises and falls according to the speed of the airflow.

Since the position of the piston controls the position of the needle in the jet, and thus the open area of the jet, while the depression in the venturi sucking fuel out of the jet remains constant, the rate of fuel delivery is always a definite function of the rate of air delivery. The precise nature of the function is determined by the tapered profile of the needle. With appropriate selection of the needle, the fuel delivery can be matched much more closely to the demands of the engine than is possible with the more common fixed-venturi carburettor, an inherently inaccurate device whose design must incorporate many complex fudges to obtain usable accuracy of fuelling. The well-controlled conditions under which the jet is operating also make it possible to obtain good and consistent atomisation of the fuel under all operating conditions.

This self-adjusting nature makes the selection of the maximum venturi diameter (colloquially, but inaccurately, referred to as "choke size") much less critical than with a fixed-venturi carburettor.

To prevent erratic and sudden movements of the piston, it is damped by light oil in a dashpot (under the white plastic cover in the picture), which requires periodic topping-up.

A major drawback of the constant-depression carburettor is its unsuitability in high-performance applications. Since it relies on restricting air flow to produce enrichment during acceleration, the throttle response lacks punch. By contrast, the fixed choke design adds extra fuel under these conditions using its accelerator pump.

== See also ==
- Solex for the Solex carburettor
- SU Carburettor, works with the same principle
- Zenith (disambiguation) for other companies named Zenith
