= Fast and Realistic OpenGL Displayer =

Generic framework

FROG
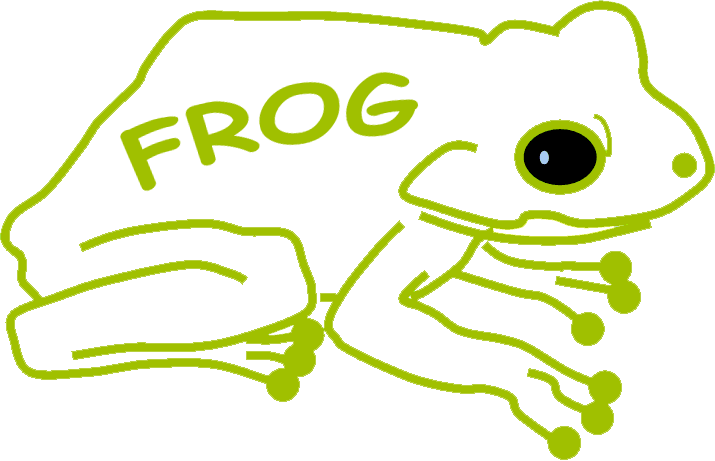
- Developer(s): Loïc Quertenmont & Vincent Roberfroid
- Stable release: 1.107 / November, 2008
- Operating system: Cross-platform
- Type: API
- License: Various
- Website: http://projects.hepforge.org/frog/

The Fast & Realistic OpenGL Displayer (FROG) is a generic framework dedicated to visualize events in a given geometry. It has been written in C++ and use OpenGL cross-platform libraries. Its first application is the visualization of events in the Compact Muon Solenoid detector.

== Introduction ==
FROG has been firstly written by Loïc Quertenmont and Vincent Roberfroid in order to view, in a matter of seconds, events in the Compact Muon Solenoid detector. This detector is located at CERN and is dedicated to measure emitted particles produced by the collisions of high energetic protons accelerated by the Large Hadron Collider.

Two other tools already exists in order to view events in the CMS detector : IGUANA and Fireworks.

However, FROG has the advantage to have been implemented as such that any particular physics experiments or detector designs can be visualized. Moreover, in comparison with the 2 other event displayers, FROG is very light and very fast and can run on various Operating System (Windows, Linux, Mac OS). In addition, FROG is self-consistent and does not require installation of big libraries generally used by High Energy physic experiments such as ROOT.

The article describes the principle of the algorithm and its many functionalities such as : 3D and 2D visualization, graphical user interface, mouse interface, configuration files, production of pictures of various format, integration of personal objects... Finally the application of FROG to the CMS experiment will be described.
