= Frog, Texas =

- Unincorporated community
- Location within Texas Location within the United States
- Coordinates: 32°43′06″N 96°08′25″W
- Country: United States
- State: Texas
- County: Kaufman
- Elevation: 541 ft (165 m)
- Time zone: UTC-6 (Central (CST))
  - Summer (DST): UTC-5 (CDT)
- GNIS feature ID: 1378335

Frog is an unincorporated community in Kaufman County, located in the U.S. state of Texas. It is located within the Dallas/Fort Worth Metroplex.

== History ==
Frog was founded by African-American settlers in the late 19th century, with some of its residents working on the railroad. Early settlers in the area had the surnames, Stephens and Starling. During the late-1930s and early 1940s, the community had a store and churches for the Pentecostal and Baptist congregations. It also had 36 homes during that time, of which 28 of them belonged to people who were in the same family. Many newcomers moved to the Frog area in 1990. While the Baptist church moved to Terrell, the Pentecostal church, which was established in either 1919 or 1920, continued to hold services. Many residents still farm for a living. The community was reported to be named for a person, not the amphibian.

== Geography ==
Frog is located on Farm to Market Road 316 just south of U.S. Highway 80, a mile east of Elmo and 7 mi (11 km) east of Terrell in Kaufman County.

== Education ==
Frog had its own school in the late 1930s and early 1940s. Today, Frog is served by the Kaufman Independent School District.
