= Frog Lake (Oregon) =

Frog Lake may refer to any of several places in the U.S. state of Oregon:

There are 8 bodies of water listed as of October 18, 2013.

name	type	elevation	coordinate	USGS Map	GNIS url
Bull Frog Lake (Clackamas County, Oregon)	Reservoir	66 ft (20 m)	45.3522°N 122.5528°W	Oregon City	
Frog Lake (Grant County, Oregon)	Lake	6,755 ft (2,059 m)	44.3144°N 118.5022°W	Roberts Creek	
Frog Lake (Wasco County, Oregon)	Lake	3,865 ft (1,178 m)	45.2192°N 121.6947°W	Wapinitia Pass	
Frog Lake (Klamath County, Oregon)	Lake	6,319 ft (1,926 m)	42.6514°N 122.2517°W	Imnaha Creek	
Frog Lake (Clackamas County, Oregon)	Reservoir	1,985 ft (605 m)	45.0928°N 122.0436°W	Fish Creek Mountain	
Frog Lake (Quosatana Creek, Curry County, Oregon)	Lake	2,671 ft (814 m)	42.4364°N 124.2794°W	Signal Buttes	
Frog Lake (Grizzly Mountain, Curry County, Oregon)	Lake	1,430 ft (440 m)	42.4028°N 124.3636°W	Signal Buttes	
Frog Lake Buttes (Wasco County, Oregon)	Summit	5,266 ft (1,605 m)	45.2178°N 121.6678°W	Wapinitia Pass	
Frog Lake Dam (Clackamas County, Oregon)	Dam	1,726 ft (526 m)	45.0897°N 122.0528°W	Fish Creek Mountain	
Frog Lake Recreation Site (Wasco County, Oregon)	Locale	3,881 ft (1,183 m)	45.2222°N 121.6936°W	Wapinitia Pass	

== See also ==
- List of lakes in Oregon
