= Frog City =

Frog City may refer to:

- Frog City Software, a software company
- Frog City, Florida, an unincorporated community in Florida, United States
- Frog City, Rhode Island, a village in Rhode Island, United States
