= Frog Lake (Wasco County, Oregon) =

Body of water in the United States

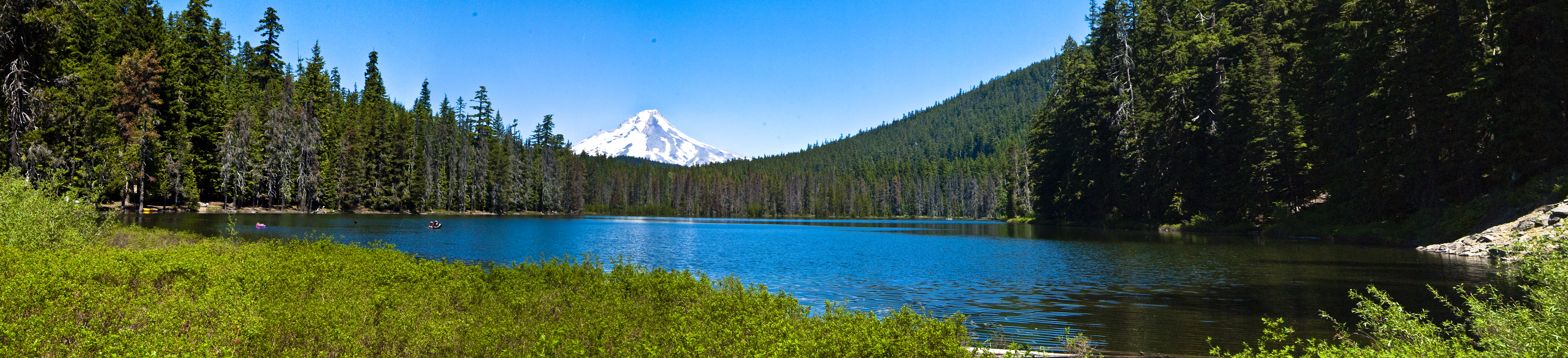
- Panorama of Frog Lake with Mount Hood in the background

- Location within Oregon Location within the United States
- Location: Wasco County, Oregon, United States
- Coordinates: 45°13′9″N 121°41′41″W
- Basin countries: United States
- Surface area: 10 acres (4.0 ha)
- Surface elevation: 3,865 ft (1,178 m)

Frog Lake is a 10-acre lake in Wasco County, Oregon, located south of Mount Hood off U.S. Route 26 between Government Camp and Maupin. The lake is primarily used for recreational purposes, such as camping, boating, fishing, and swimming.

The lake is the source of Frog Creek, a tributary of Clear Creek, a tributary of the White River.

== See also ==
- Frog Lake (Oregon), for other lakes with the name
- List of lakes in Oregon
