= FMN reductase (NAD(P)H) =

Enzyme

Identifiers
- EC no.: 1.5.1.39

Databases
- IntEnz: IntEnz view
- BRENDA: BRENDA entry
- ExPASy: NiceZyme view
- KEGG: KEGG entry
- MetaCyc: metabolic pathway
- PRIAM: profile
- PDB structures: RCSB PDB PDBe PDBsum
Search
- PMC: articles
- PubMed: articles
- NCBI: proteins

FMN reductase (NAD(P)H) (EC 1.5.1.39, FRG) is an enzyme with systematic name FMNH_{2}:NAD(P)^{+} oxidoreductase. This enzyme catalyses the following chemical reaction

FMNH2 + NAD(P)^{+} $\rightleftharpoons$ FMN + NAD(P)H + H^{+}

This enzyme contains FMN.
