= Puss in the Corner =

Puss in the Corner, also called Puss in Corner is a patience or solitaire card game that is played with a single pack of 52 playing cards. It is of the half-open, planner type and is a "thinly disguised variant of Sir Tommy," but with modifications and with the waste piles placed at the corners of the foundations, hence the name. It has the rare feature that the suits are built up in colour, not in suit.

== Rules ==
The following rules conform to Parlett (1979) and Morehead (2001), except where stated.

Set-up: First, the four aces are separated from the rest of the pack and placed side by side in two rows of two, forming a square. These are the foundations and the aim is to build on them in one colour and in sequence up to the kings. So diamonds and hearts may be built on one another, indiscriminately, and likewise, spades and clubs.

Game-play: The player first turns the top card of the stock and determines if it can be built on the foundations; if not it is moved to start one of up to four wastepiles. Subsequently a card may be played from the stock to the foundations (but only if it is the same colour and next in sequence) or to any of the wastepiles. Equally a card may be moved from the top of a wastepile to a foundation if it is the same colour and the next in sequence. Only one card may be moved at a time. To reflect the name of the game, each wastepile is placed with its longer edge lying diagonally against a corner of the square forming the foundations.

Redeal: After the stock is exhausted, the player may have one redeal. To do this, the player must pick up the four wastepiles in any order, and without shuffling, restart the process. The game ends when this second stock is used up.

The game is won when all the cards have been played to the foundations.

== Cultural depictions ==
In the 1937 film The Prisoner of Zenda, Rupert of Hentzau, played by Douglas Fairbanks Jr. mentions the game while engaged in a sword fight with the hero, played by Ronald Colman.

== See also ==
- Sir Tommy
- List of patiences and card solitaires
- Glossary of patience and solitaire terms

== Bibliography ==
- Little Giant Encyclopedia: Card Games (2009). Diagram Group. Sterling, New York/London. p. 413. ISBN 978-1-4027-6417-2
