= Sir Tommy =

Card game

- A patience or card solitaire game
- Alternative names: The Old Patience, Sir Tommy Patience, Try Again
- Type: Planner
- Deck: Single 52-card pack
- Playing time: 5 min
- Odds of winning: 1 in 5

Sir Tommy, also called Old Patience, is a patience or solitaire card game using a single pack of 52 playing cards. It is said to be the ancestor of all patiences, hence its alternative title. It is a half-open, planner type of patience game in the same family of card-building games as Calculation and Strategy. It is also known as Try Again and Numerica. Ednah Cheney (1869) calls it Solitaire and says "it is the simplest form of patience".

== Rules ==
Cards are dealt one at a time. When an ace turns up, it forms a foundation which builds up to King regardless of suit. Four such foundations should be built. A card that cannot yet be placed on the foundation is placed onto one of eight wastepiles; once placed, it cannot be moved, but the top card of each wastepile remains available to be placed on a foundation.

The game is won if all cards are emptied from the wastepiles and built on the foundations.

== Strategy ==
To achieve a win, skilled players typically reserve one wastepile for Kings and for other high cards, and trying to avoid trapping a lower-ranked card under all four cards of some higher rank. Albert Morehead and Geoffrey Mott-Smith estimate that a player can win one in five games; David Parlett thinks that the odds are much lower, perhaps as little as one in sixteen.

== Variants ==
Many variants exist, including one where four cards are turned up at a time rather than one, and must all be placed before making other moves. Puss in the Corner has a slightly different layout, and is a very similar game except that building happens by colour rather than suit.

Closely related to Sir Tommy are Auld Lang Syne and Tam O'Shanter, both of which are considered nearly impossible to win; Old Fashioned and Acquaintance are both slightly easier versions of Auld Lang Syne.

In the less flexible Alternate, the foundations are two aces of one colour and two kings of the other; these are built up from the aces and down from the kings in sequences of alternating colours. Building happens by colour in the variant Colours, with six waste-piles making the game easier.

Strategy is a Sir Tommy variant invented by Albert H. Morehead and Geoffrey Mott-Smith, and uses eight tableau piles to make the game much easier. Last Chance is also easier courtesy of seven tableau piles and a reserve pile.

The popular patience game Calculation is also derivative from Sir Tommy, and changes the goal to place cards on the foundations by increasing ranks of 1, 2, 3 and 4 respectively, and is a game of great skill.

== See also ==
- List of solitaires
- Glossary of solitaire

== Literature ==
- Cheney, Mrs. E. D. (1869). Patience: A Series of Games with Cards. 2nd edn, with additions. Boston: Lee & Shepard. NY: Lee, Shepard & Dillingham.
- Parlett, David Sidney (1979). The Penguin Book of Patience. London: A. Lane ISBN 0-7139-1193-X OCLC 6633144
- Pole, W. (1875). "Games at Cards for One Player" in Macmillan’s Magazine. January 1875, Toronto: Robarts. pp. 242 ff. Account of "The Old Patience".
- Morehead, Albert H. and Geoffrey Mott-Smith (2001) The Complete Book of Solitaire and Patience. Slough: Foulsham OCLC 1357504346
- Whitmore Jones, Mary (1888,90). "Old Tommy Patience" in Games of Patience for One or More Players. 1st Series. London: L. Upcott Gill. pp. 9–10.
