= Calculation (card game) =

Solitaire card game

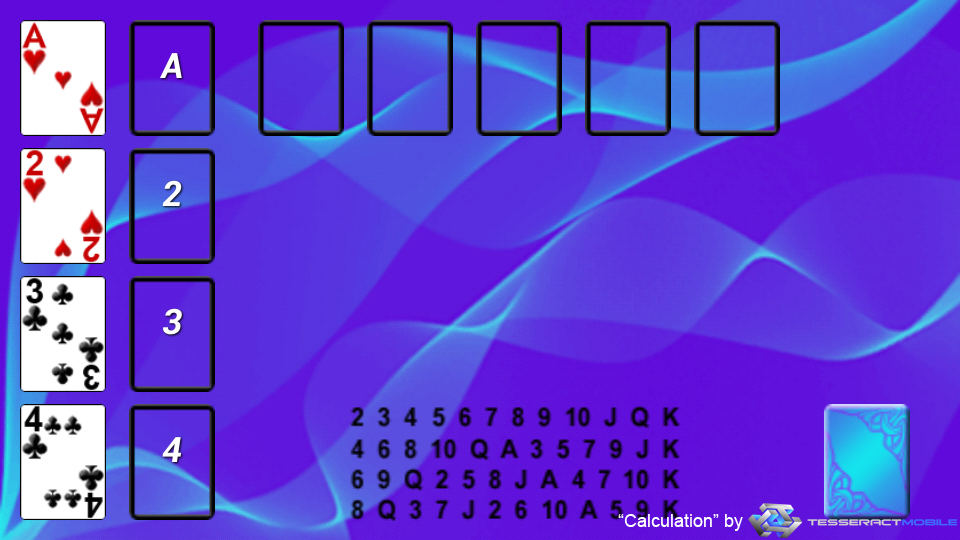
Screenshot of Calculation

Calculation (also known as Broken Intervals, Hopscotch, and Four Kings Solitaire) is a solitaire card game played with a standard pack of 52 cards. It is part of the Sir Tommy family of patience games. It has its origin in France, where it is known as La Plus Belle.

Good strategy typically sees players use 6s, 8s, and Queens early and 10s, Jacks, and Kings later; clever placement of cards in the waste is also critical, with some players reserving one waste pile for the Kings.

== Rules ==
At the start of play, an ace, two, three, and four of any suit are removed from a standard deck of cards and laid out as the foundations. The ace foundation is to be built up in sequence until the king is reached, regardless of suit. The other foundations are similarly built up, but by twos, threes, and fours, respectively, until they each reach a king, as in the following table:

Foundation	A	2	3	4	5	6	7	8	9	10	J	Q	K
Foundation	2	4	6	8	10	Q	A	3	5	7	9	J	K
Foundation	3	6	9	Q	2	5	8	J	A	4	7	10	K
Foundation	4	8	Q	3	7	J	2	6	10	A	5	9	K

The tableau, initially empty, consists of four piles of cards, usually arranged immediately below the four foundations.

Play in Calculation is simple. A single card is turned up from the stock and played either to the top of any of the four tableau piles, or onto one of the foundations if desired. The top card of any tableau pile may also be played onto one of the foundation piles if it is the next number in the appropriate sequence for that foundation. The game is won when all cards have been played onto the foundations, and lost when no further play is possible.

== Variants ==
As a variation, cards may be played from the stock to a waste pile which holds one card, and played from there to a foundation or tableau, instead of being played from the stock to a foundation or tableau as soon as they are turned over.

Variations which make Calculation more difficult are to play all 52 cards without the starting A,2,3,4 on the foundations, or to use only three instead of four tableau piles. Playing with both these variations makes the game quite difficult, but a very skilled player will still be able to win at least two games out of three.

Devil's Grip is a broadly related game with similar game-play to Calculation, using two-decks stripped of the Aces, and playing cards to a 3x8 grid where cards increase by three in rank.

Musical is a related game in which cards are played from the stock to a single pile, but in which the stock contains 44 cards rather than 48, and in which the stock can be dealt three times.

== See also ==
- List of solitaires
- Glossary of solitaire
