= Saab Automobile =

Swedish car manufacturer (1945–2016)

Saab Automobile AB
- Type: Division
- Industry: Automotive
- Founded: 1945
- Founder: Saab AB
- Defunct: 2016
- Fate: Bankrupt
- Successor: NEVS
- Headquarters: Trollhättan, Sweden
- Area served: Worldwide
- Key people: Jan-Åke Jonsson (final General Manager)
- Products: Automobiles
- Parent: Saab AB (1945–1968); Saab-Scania (1968–1990); General Motors (1990–2010); Spyker N.V. (2010–2012); NEVS (2012–2014)
- Divisions: Saab Aero
- Website: saabparts.com

Saab Automobile AB (/sɑːb/) was a car manufacturer that was founded in Sweden in 1945 when its parent company, Saab AB, began a project to design a small automobile. The first production model, the Saab 92, was launched in 1949. In 1968, the parent company merged with Scania-Vabis, and ten years later the Saab 900 was launched, in time becoming Saab's best-selling model. In the mid-1980s, the new Saab 9000 model also appeared.

In 1989, the automobile division of Saab-Scania was restructured into an independent company, Saab Automobile AB. The American manufacturer General Motors (GM) took 50 percent ownership. Two well-known models to come out of this period were the Saab 9-3 and the Saab 9-5. Then, in 2000, GM exercised its option to acquire the remaining 50 percent. In 2010, GM sold Saab Automobile AB to the Dutch automobile manufacturer Spyker Cars N.V.

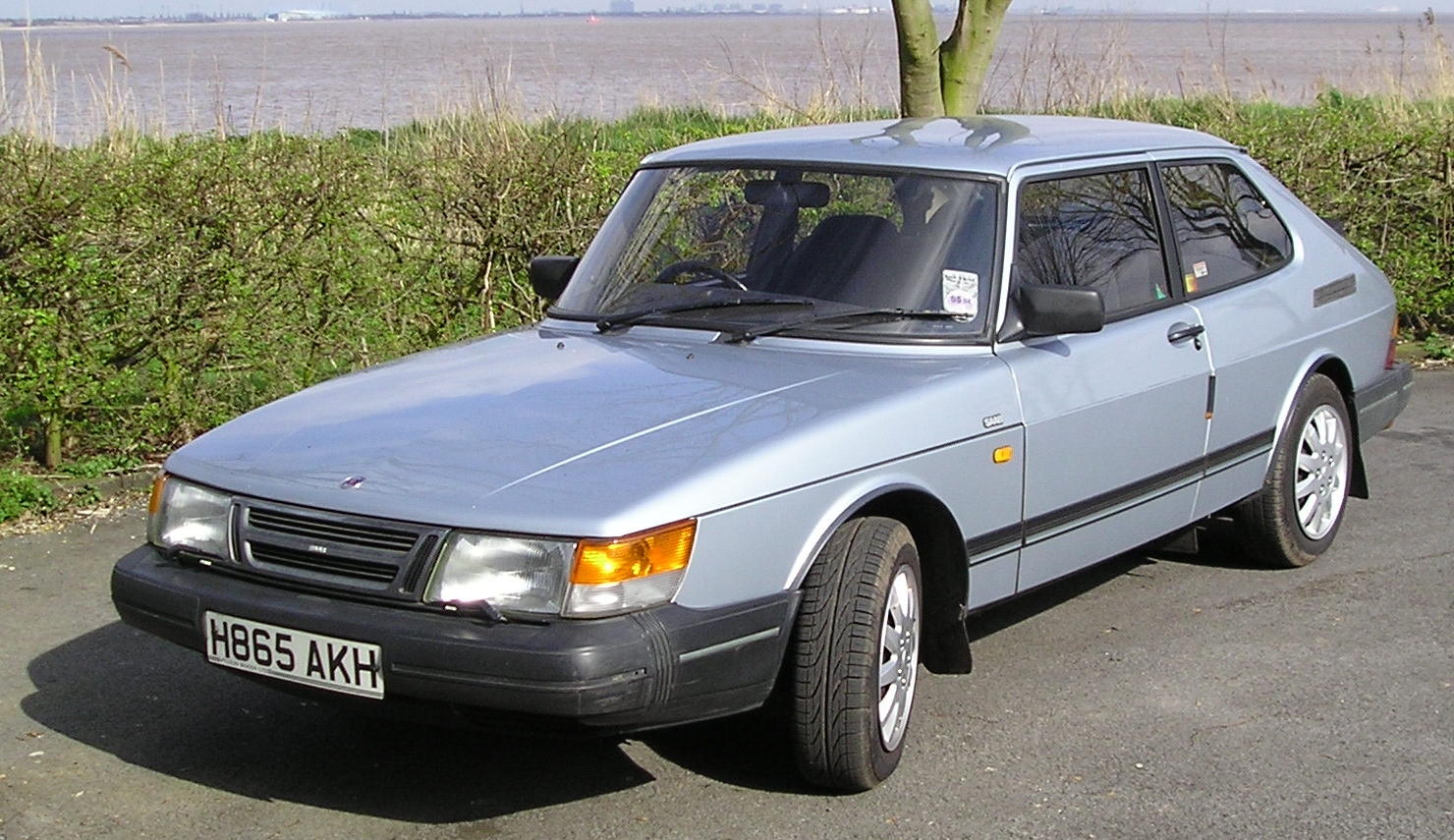
Saab 900

After many years establishing a sound engineering reputation and ultimately a luxury price tag, Saab failed to build its customer base beyond its niche following. After struggling to avoid insolvency throughout 2011, the company petitioned for bankruptcy following the failure of a Chinese consortium to complete a purchase of the company; the purchase had been blocked by the former owner GM, which opposed the transfer of technology and production rights to a Chinese company. On 13 June 2012, it was announced that a newly formed company called National Electric Vehicle Sweden (NEVS) had bought Saab Automobile's bankrupt estate. According to "Saab United", the first NEVS Saab 9-3 drove off its pre-production line on 19 September 2013. Full production restarted on 2 December 2013, initially the same petrol-powered 9-3 Aero sedans that were built before Saab went bankrupt, and intended to get the car manufacturer's supply chain re-established as it attempted development of a new line of NEVS-Saab products. NEVS lost its license to manufacture automobiles under the Saab name (which the namesake aerospace company still owns) in the summer of 2014 and later produced electric cars based on the Saab 9-3 but under its own new car designation "NEVS".

== History ==
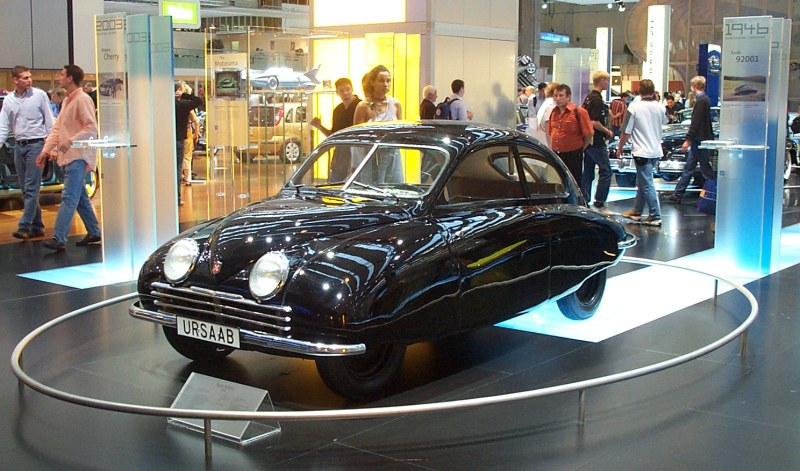
Ursaab, the prototype for the Saab 92 – Saab's first automobile

=== Svenska Aeroplan AB (1948–1969) ===
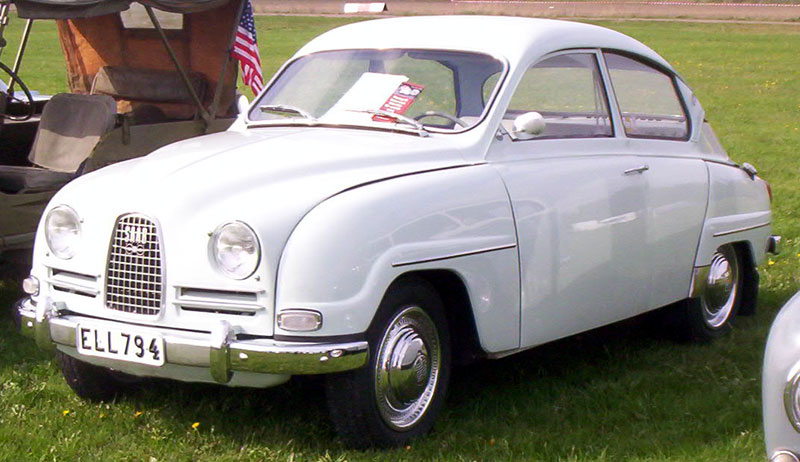
Saab 96

Saab, acronym for Svenska Aeroplan Aktiebolaget (Swedish aeroplane corporation), a Swedish aerospace and defence company, was created in 1937 in Linköping. The company had been established in 1937 for the express purpose of building aircraft for the Swedish Air Force to protect the country's neutrality as Europe moved closer to World War II. As the war drew to a close and the market for fighter planes seemed to weaken, the company began looking for new markets to diversify.

An automobile design project was started in 1945 with the internal name "X9248". The design project became formally known as "Project 92"; the 92 being next in production sequence after the Saab 91, a single engine trainer aircraft. In 1948, a company site in Trollhättan was converted to allow automobile assembly and the project moved there, along with the car manufacturing headquarters, which has remained there since. The company made four prototypes named "Ursaab" or "original Saab", numbered 92001 through to 92004, before designing the production model, the Saab 92, in 1949.

The Saab 92 went into production in December 1949. 20,000 cars were sold through the mid-1950s. The 92 was thoroughly redesigned and re-engineered in 1955, and was renamed as the "Saab 93". The car's engine gained a cylinder, going from two to three and its front fascia became the first to sport the first incarnation of Saab's trademark trapezoidal radiator grill. A wagon variant, the Saab 95, was added in 1959. The decade also saw Saab's first performance car, the Saab 94, the first of the Saab Sonetts.

1960 saw the third major revision to the 92's platform as the Saab 96. The 96 was an important model for Saab: it was the first Saab to be widely exported out of Sweden. The unusual vehicle proved very popular, selling nearly 550,000 examples. Unlike American cars of the day, the 93, 95 and 96 all featured the 3-cylinder 2-cycle engine, which required adding oil to the petrol tank, front-wheel drive, and freewheeling, which allowed the driver to downshift the on-the-column manual shifter without using the clutch. Front seat shoulder belts were also an early feature.

Even more important to the company's fortunes was 1968's Saab 99. The 99 was the first all-new Saab in 19 years and a clean break from the 92. The 99 had many innovations and features that would come to define Saabs for decades: wraparound windscreen, self-repairing bumpers, headlamp washers and side-impact door beams. The design by Sixten Sason was no less revolutionary than the underlying technology, and elements like the Saab hockey stick profile graphic continue to influence Saab's design language.

=== Saab-Scania (1969–1989) ===
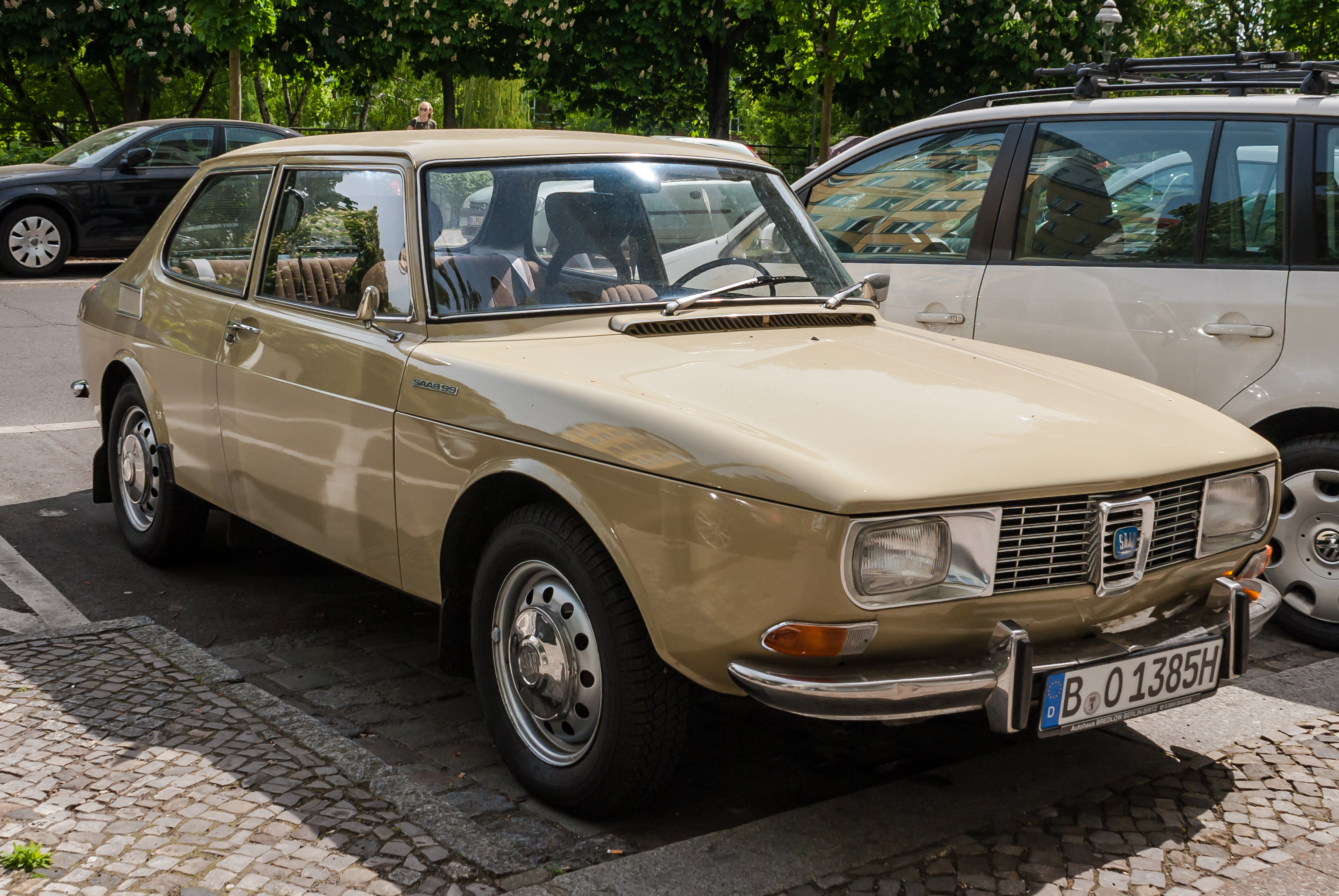
The Saab 99 was launched in 1969 as an all-new design.

In 1969, Saab AB merged with the Swedish commercial vehicle manufacturer Scania-Vabis AB to form Saab-Scania AB, under the Wallenberg family umbrella.

The 99 range was expanded in 1973 with the addition of a combi coupé model, a body style which became synonymous with Saab. The millionth Saab automobile was produced in 1976.

Saab entered into an agreement with Fiat in 1978 to sell a rebadged Lancia Delta as the Saab 600 and jointly develop a new platform. The agreement yielded 1985's Saab 9000, sister to the Alfa Romeo 164, Fiat Croma and Lancia Thema; all rode atop a common Type Four chassis. The 9000 was Saab's first proper luxury car but failed to achieve the planned sales volume.

1978 also was the first year for the 99's replacement: the Saab 900. Nearly one million 900s would be produced, making it Saab's best-selling and most iconic model. A popular convertible version followed in 1986, all of which were made at the Saab-Valmet factory in Finland, making up nearly 20% of 900 sales. Even today, the "classic 900" retains a cult following.

=== General Motors and Investor AB (1989–2000) ===
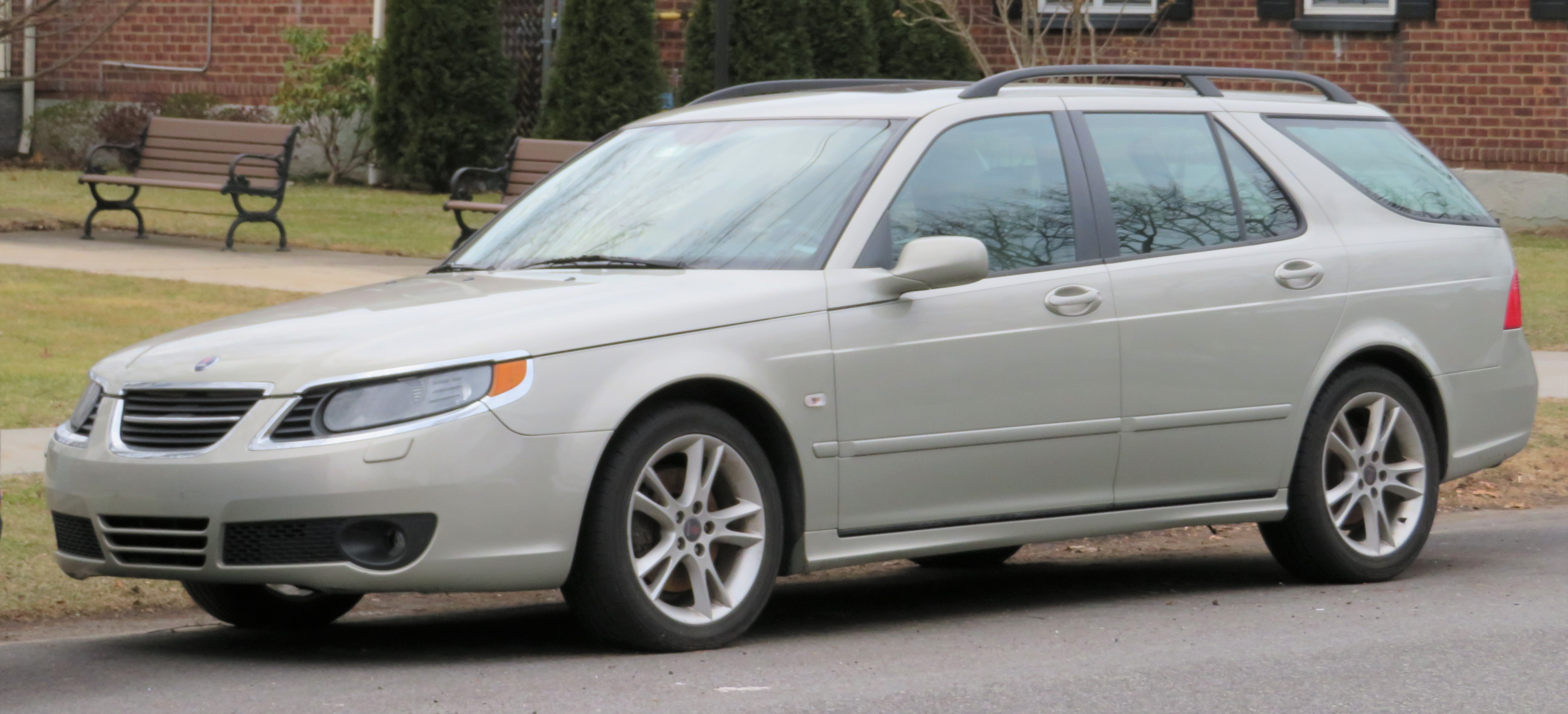
Saab 9-5

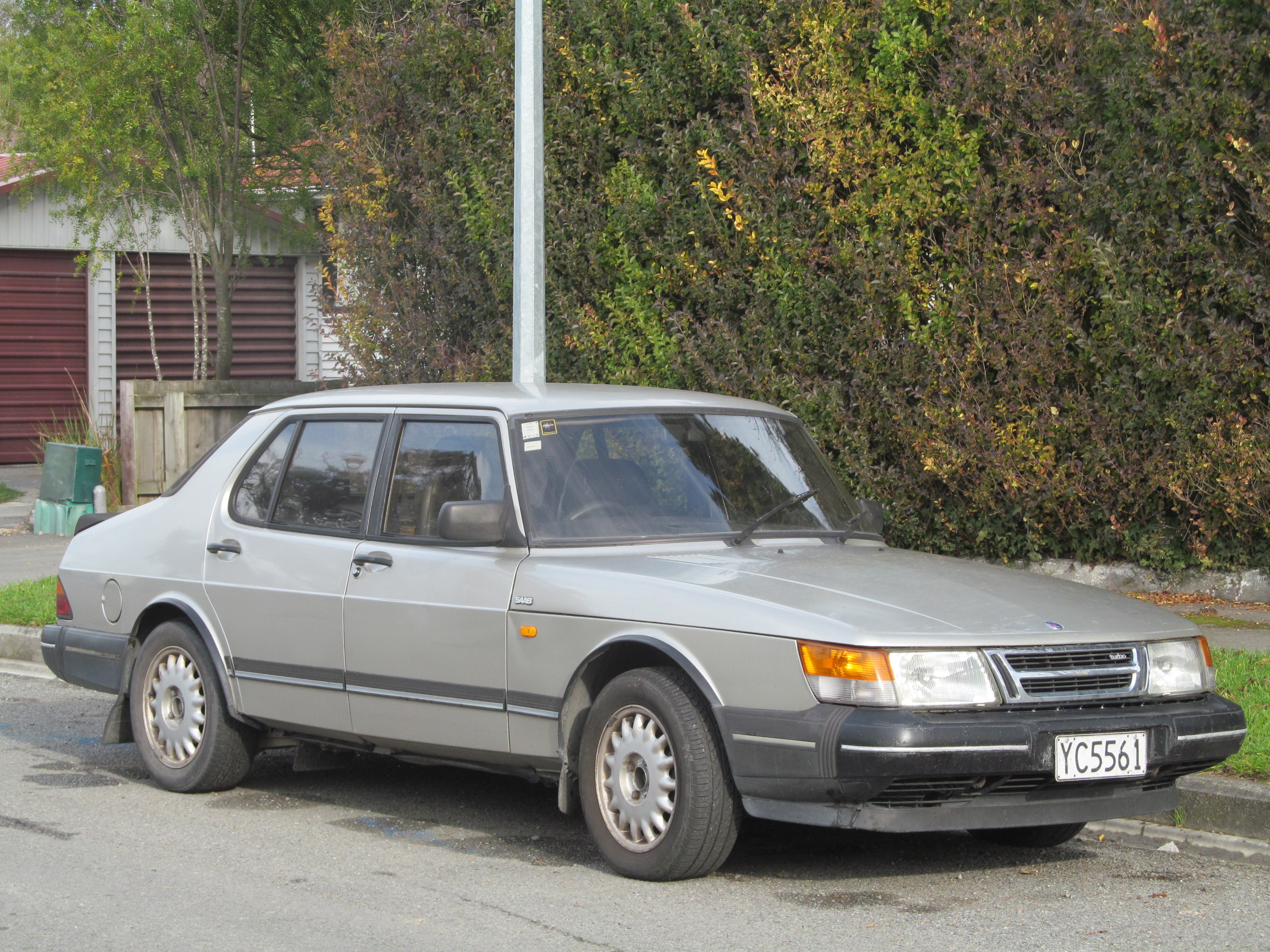
Saab 900

In 1989, the Saab car division of Saab-Scania was restructured into an independent company, Saab Automobile AB, headquartered in Sweden; General Motors and Investor AB controlled 50% each. GM's investment of US$600 million gave it the option to acquire the remaining shares within a decade. In the fall of 1989 Saab opened a new factory in Malmö. Located in the old Kockums shipyard, this was a novel kind of factory with extensive worker control and a focus on workers' comfort, an effort to increase productivity and retain skilled workers. With an annual capacity of 60,000 cars (to be increased to 90,000 cars by 1995), the factory began production at a time of shrinking sales and economic contraction and only built 10,176 cars in 1990 (the only full year of production). After a review by GM, the factory changed over to a standard assembly line but was nonetheless shuttered in June 1991, after 20,664 cars had been built in about two years.

General Motors' involvement spurred the launch of a new 900 in 1994. The new car shared a platform with the Opel Vectra. Due in large part to its success, Saab earned a profit in 1995 for the first time in seven years. However, the model never achieved the cult following of the "classic 900" and did not achieve the same reputation for quality.

1997 marked Saab's 50th anniversary as a car manufacturer. The company used its jubilee owners' convention to launch a replacement for the aging 9000: the Saab 9-5. The 900 received a facelift and renaming complementary to its new larger sibling: it would now be called the Saab 9-3. The 9-5 was the first Saab without a combi coupé body style option in 20 years. Filling that space was a wagon variant, introduced in 1999.

=== General Motors (2000–2010) ===
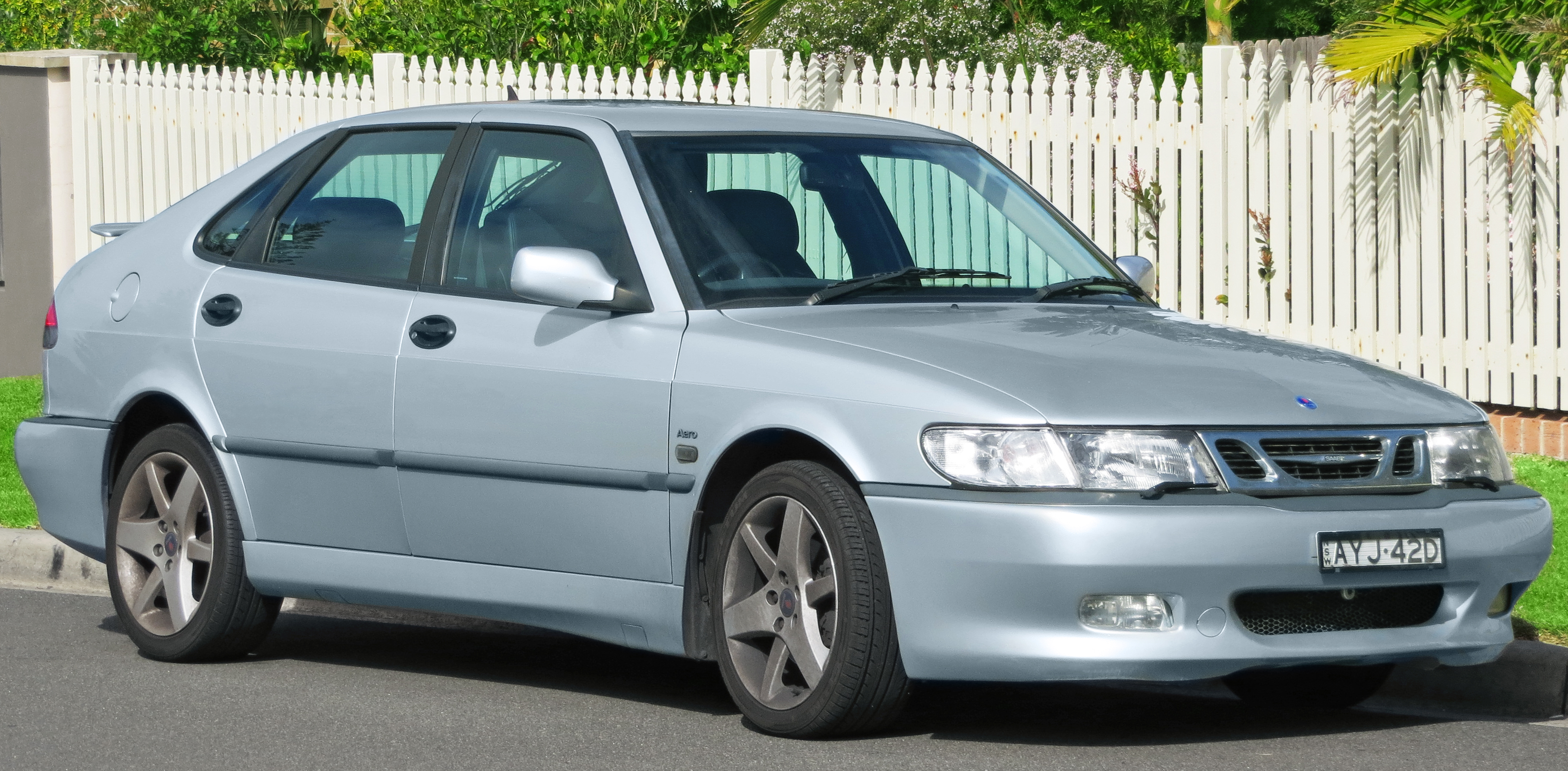
Saab 9-3 Aero

GM exercised its option to acquire the remaining Saab shares in 2000, spending US$125 million to turn the company into a wholly owned subsidiary.

The new close relationship yielded its first product in 2003's all-new 9-3. The new model, marketed as a sport sedan, dropped Saab's iconic hatchback in favour of a more conventional four-door approach. The model shared a co-developed platform (GM's "global Epsilon 1 platform") and some other components with the Opel Vectra again, but the relationship was much more of a joint engineering effort than before.

Under GM's direction, the badge-engineered Saab 9-2X (based on the Subaru Impreza) and Saab 9-7X (based on the Chevrolet Trailblazer) were introduced in the American market in 2005, with the hope of increasing sales. Both models were a critical and commercial failure and were cancelled a few years after production began. GM also delayed the 9-3 wagon by three years, shelved a hatchback derivative of the 9-3 sedan, stalled plans for all-wheel-drive capabilities in Saab models until 2008, cancelled a 9-5 replacement in 2005, and announced a planned shift of production away from Saab's historic home in Trollhättan to Opel's factory in Rüsselsheim.

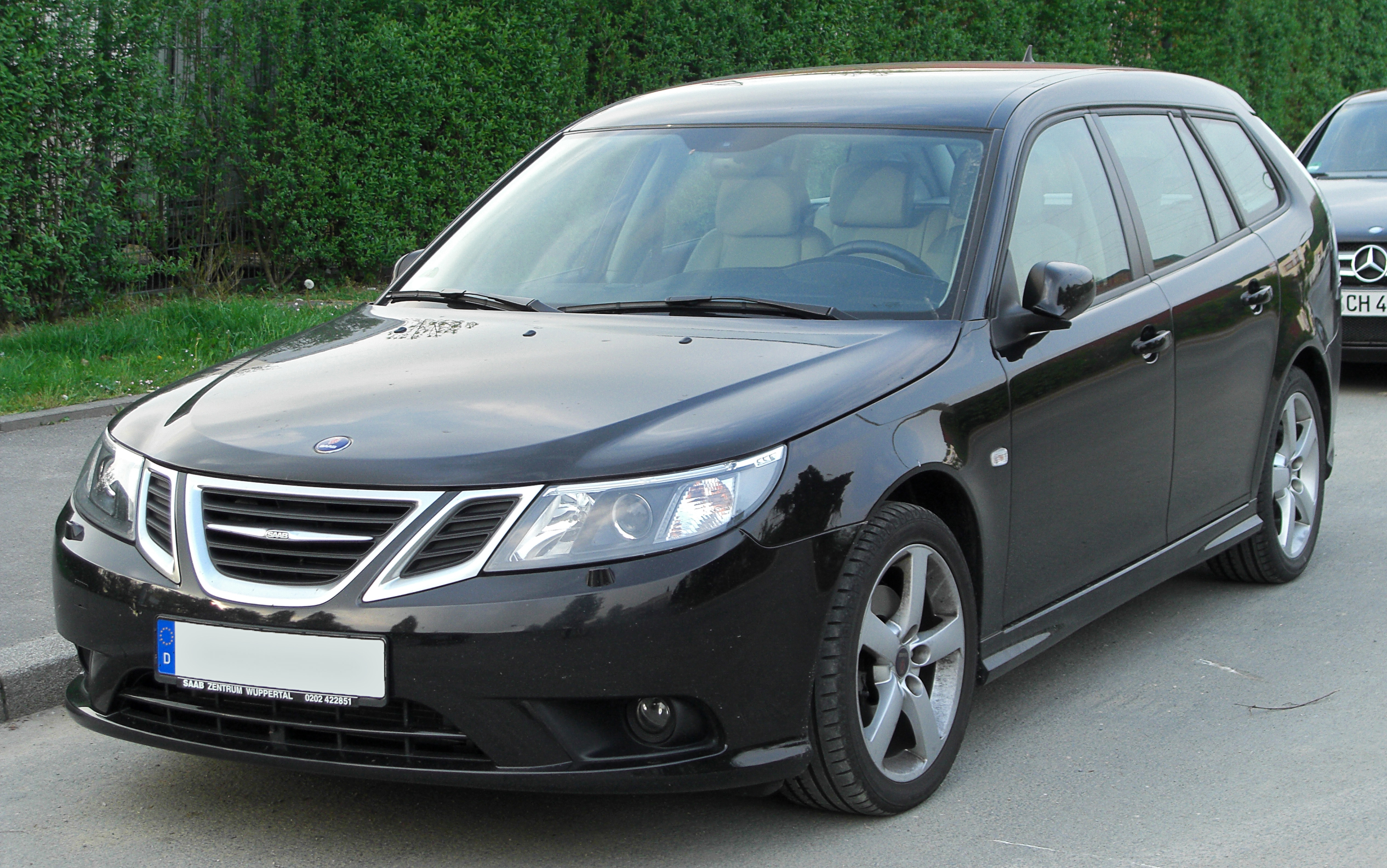
Saab 9-3 SportCombi

Owing to fading fortunes across its entire business due to a slowing economy in 2007, GM announced that the Saab brand was "under review" in December 2008, a process which included the possibility of selling or shuttering the car maker.

As the talks progressed, GM's support receded, and Saab went into administration, the Swedish equivalent of America's Chapter 11 bankruptcy. Saab's managing director Jan-Åke Jonsson said that this was "the best way to create a truly independent entity that is ready for investment". For its part, the Swedish government was reluctant to become involved, with Maud Olofsson, industry minister, stating: "The Swedish state and taxpayers in Sweden will not own car factories. Sometimes you get the impression that this is a small, small company but it is the world's biggest automaker so we have a right to make demands."

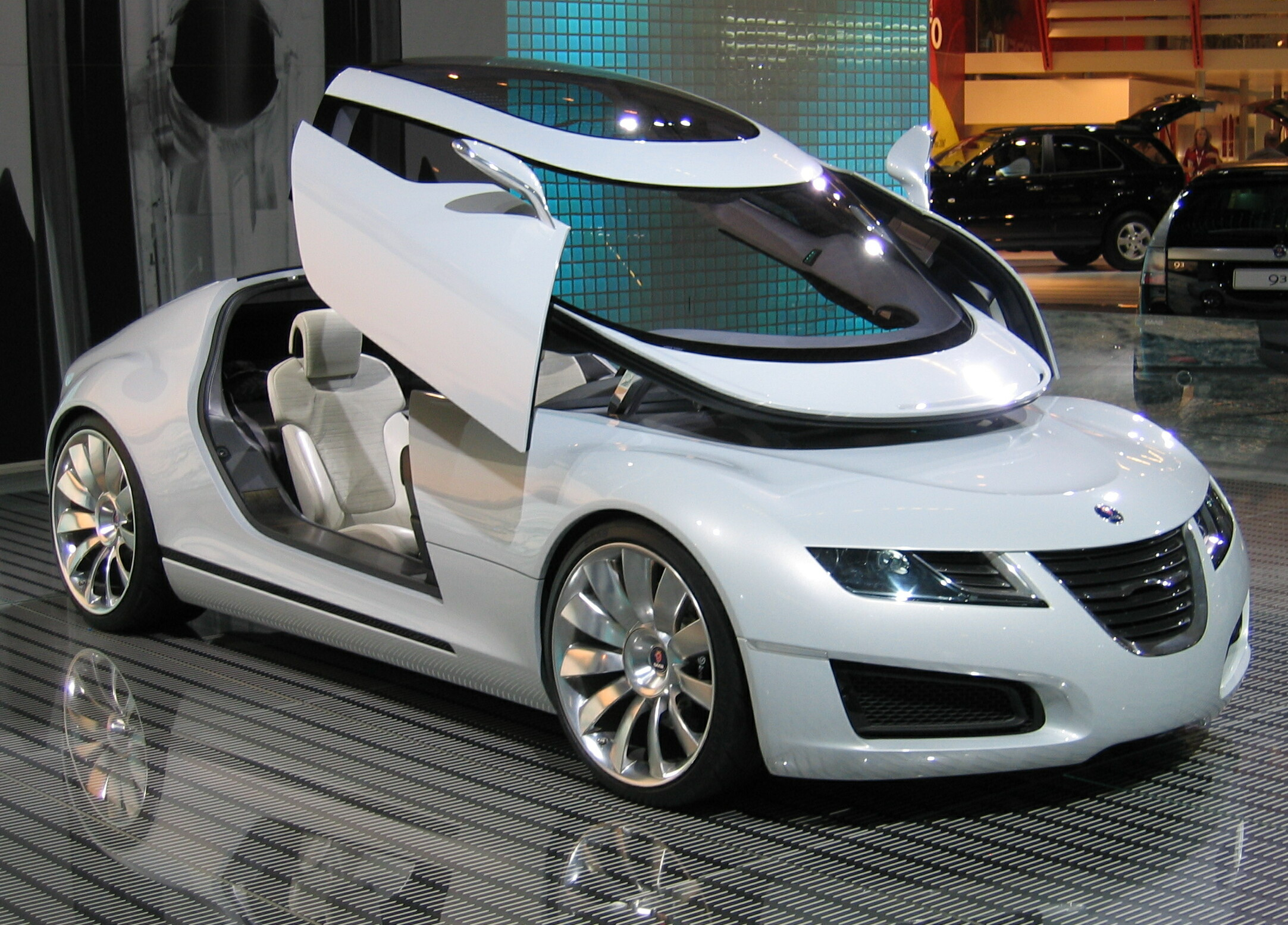
Saab Aero-X

On 16 June 2009, Koenigsegg announced its intention to purchase the brand from GM. The bid was backed by a group of Norwegian investors and the Chinese car maker Beijing Automotive Industry Holding Co Ltd (BAIC). The following month, both parties announced that GM had consented to the deal. There were outstanding financial details, but a loan from the European Investment Bank was expected to cover them. The loan was approved in October, but on 24 November 2009, Koenigsegg announced that it had "come to the painful and difficult conclusion that it could no longer carry out the acquisition" mostly because of the constant delays and the difficulties coordinating the involved parties: GM, the European Investment Bank, the Swedish National Debt Office and BAIC.

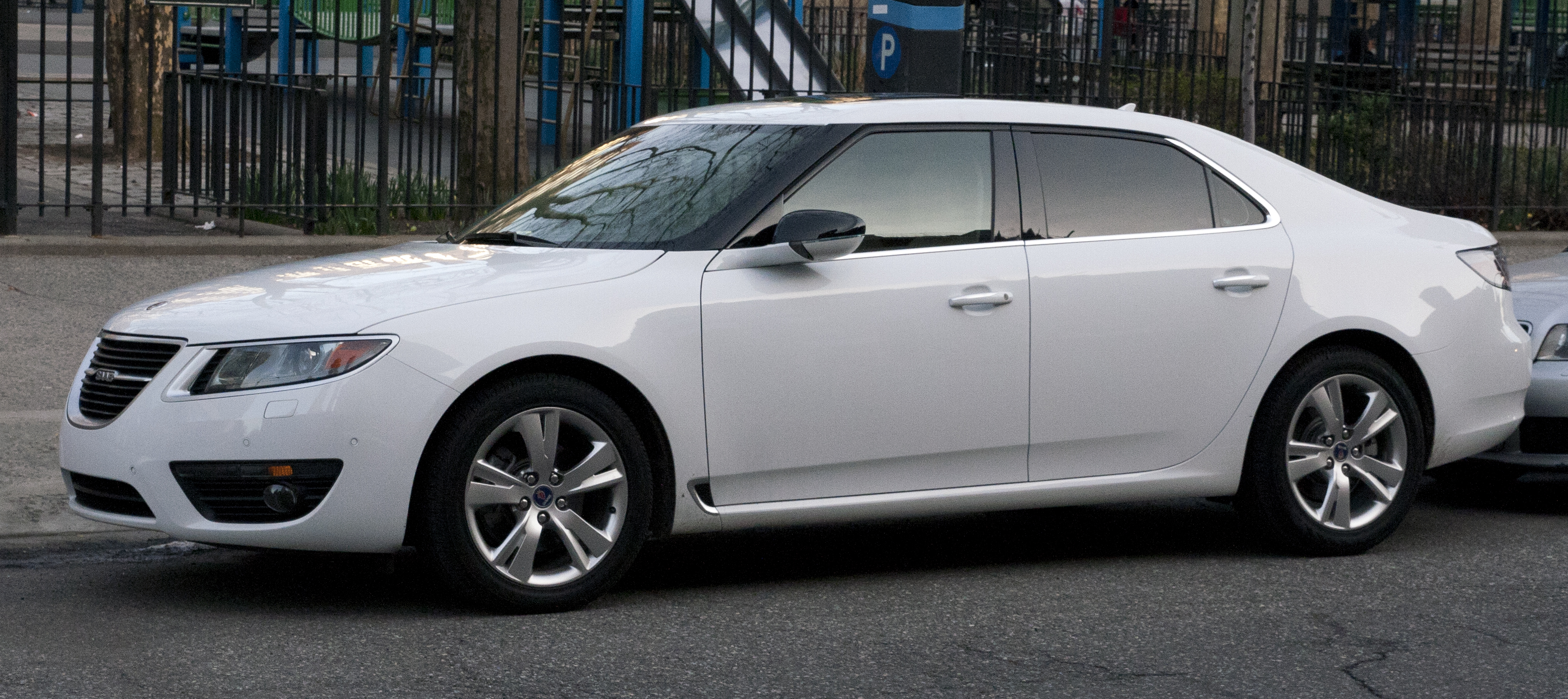
Second generation Saab 9-5

It was announced on 14 December 2009, that the Chinese car manufacturer would acquire the intellectual property rights and production equipment for the previous generation Saab 9-3 and Saab 9–5 in a deal worth about US$197 million, which was enough for the company to run for three months. BAIC expressed its intention to create a new brand around the purchased technology and admitted to the purchase of "three overall vehicle platforms, two engine technologies and two transmission systems."

Following the collapse of talks with Koenigsegg, GM announced that the brand would be eliminated in 2010 if it failed to secure a buyer before the close of 2009. As talks with several firms failed, including the Netherlands-based boutique sports car maker Spyker, GM formally announced its intention to wind down the Saab brand.

Undeterred, a new offer round materialised. Earlier bidders Spyker and Merbanco revised their offers and were joined by a submission from Luxembourg-based Genii Capital, which boasted the support of F1 chief Bernie Ecclestone. GM continued accepting bids until a self-imposed deadline of 7 January 2010. Acknowledging that the chances of reaching a deal with any party were very slim, they pledged to evaluate each offer with due diligence.

=== Spyker/Swedish Automobile (2010–2011) ===
==== 2010 – purchase of Saab ====
On 26 January, General Motors (GM) confirmed it had agreed to sell Saab to Spyker N.V. subject to regulatory and government approval; the sale was completed on 23 February 2010. General Motors would continue to supply Saab with engines and transmissions, and also completed vehicles in the shape of the new Saab 9-4x from GM's Mexican factory. The deal included a loan from the European Investment Bank, guaranteed by the Swedish government. It comprised US$74m in cash up front, payable to GM by July 2010, and shares in Spyker to the tune of US$320m.

==== 2011 – bankruptcy ====
On 25 February, Spyker Cars N.V. announced that it had agreed to sell the sports car arm to focus on Saab. Spyker intended to change its name, in May, to include the Saab name.

In early 2011, Saab began to run out of money, and Spyker were not able to cover the losses. Both companies stopped paying bills, and on 30 March several suppliers refused further deliveries to Saab's factory in Trollhättan. Initially Spyker CEO Victor Muller blamed the media for the problems, and claimed that Saab had no problems with funding. On 5 April all production was halted at Saab's plant in Trollhättan.

Spyker CEO Victor Muller tried to obtain funding from several different sources. On 30 March his former sponsor, Russian banker Vladimir Antonov, applied to Swedish authorities, the EIB and General Motors for permission to become a shareholder in Saab. His request was denied by the EIB, citing concerns about his business practices.

On 3 May, a joint venture between Saab and Chinese carmaker Hawtai was announced. This deal quickly unraveled and on 12 May Hawtai walked away from Saab.

Plans for a new joint venture with Chinese carmaker Youngman and Chinese automotive retailer Pang Da followed shortly. After months of negotiations the companies agreed to a joint US$140 million takeover of Saab Automobile and its UK dealer network unit from Swedish Automobile, with Youngman and Pang Da taking 60 and 40 percent stakes respectively.

On 6 December, GM announced that it would not continue its licenses to GM patents and technology to Saab if the company was sold to Pang Da and Zhejiang Youngman, stating that the new owner's use of the technology was not in the best interest of GM investors. Because of this, Saab started working on a new proposal which would not change the original ownership structure and would not include a Chinese partner as an owner of the company, but instead as a 50% owner of a new daughter company.

On 19 December 2011, with no alternatives left after GM continued to block any form of involvement with a Chinese partner, Saab officially filed for bankruptcy after a three-year fight for survival. Under Sweden's bankruptcy laws, a party that files for bankruptcy can be bought out of bankruptcy.

On 16 April 2012, a meeting on Saab's bankruptcy was held at the District Court of Vänersborg. The official receivers in charge of the Saab liquidation valued the assets at US$500m and the debt at US$2,000m. After subtracting the value of the assets, Saab leaves a debt of US$1,500m.

==== 2012 – US$3 billion damages claim ====
On 6 August 2012, Spyker, represented by the law firm Patton Boggs, filed a lawsuit against General Motors in the United States District Court of the Eastern District of Michigan claiming US$3 billion in damages for the actions GM took in the fall of 2011 to stop the various proposed deals between Spyker and Youngman concerning Saab Automobile where Youngman claimed to be ready to invest several billion dollars in Saab Automobile to guarantee its future. More precisely, under the Automotive Technology License Agreement (ATLA) between GM Global Technology Operations Inc (GTO) and Saab, GM refused licensing of the platforms and technology in Saab cars if any Chinese party were to be involved in Saab's ownership structure.

To solve this issue, Spyker and Youngman came up with a deal where Youngman would provide Saab with a loan of €200 million which would be converted into an equity interest in Saab only after Saab ceased using GM technology in its vehicles. Despite this, GM maintained that it would still refuse licensing of platforms and technology needed for production of Saab cars in Trollhättan and also threatened to cease 9-4X production at GM's plant in Mexico, should the deal go through.

Consequently, the deal finally collapsed and Saab was forced to file for bankruptcy. According to Spyker, the actions taken by GM were not legal. Since Saab had been in receivership since the bankruptcy, and would be until the deal with Nevs was closed, Spyker and the receivers of Saab Automobile had entered into an agreement where Spyker would bear the costs of the litigation in exchange for 90% of the claim if the case is successful.

==== 2013 – claim dismissed ====
In June 2013, the district court dismissed the lawsuit, ruling that General Motors was within its rights to block the sale. In October 2014, the circuit court of appeals upheld the dismissal.

=== National Electric Vehicle Sweden (2012–2014) ===
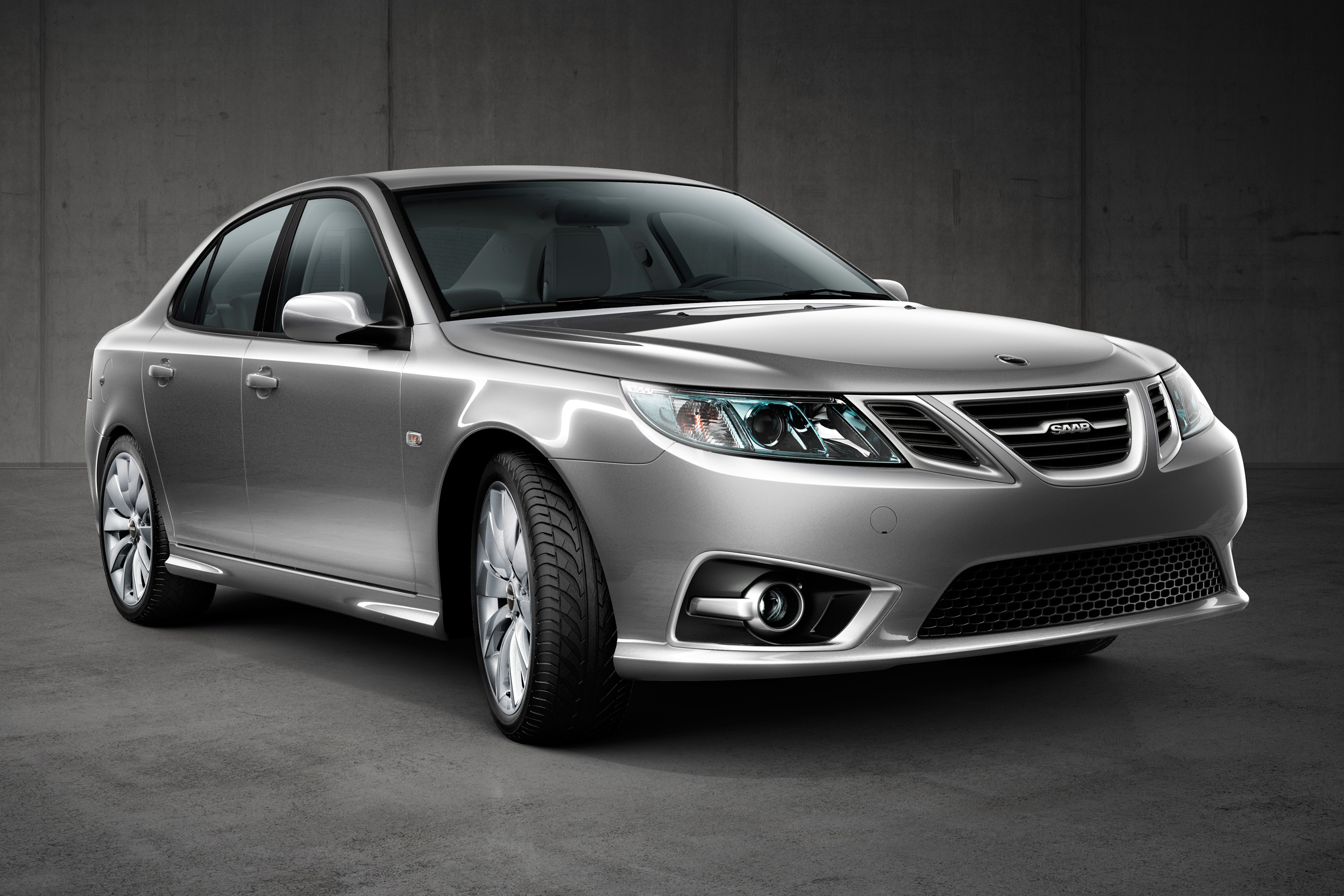
Saab 9-3 Aero Sedan MY14 in silver colour

On 13 June 2012, a press conference was held announcing that the bankruptcy assets of Saab Automobile AB and its subsidiaries Saab Automobile Powertrain AB and Saab Automobile Tools AB as well as the Saab factory had been acquired by a Chinese consortium called National Electric Vehicle Sweden (NEVS). This company was founded by Hong-Kong based National Modern Energy Holdings (NME) and Japan based Sun Investment, for the sole purpose of acquiring Saab's bankruptcy assets.

Saab Automobile Parts AB was excluded in the deal and the Swedish National Debt Office would continue as an owner of that company. NEVS' plan was to build only purely electric vehicles with an electric version of the current 9-3 model available in 2013/2014, as well as to continue development of the replacement to the 9–3, the PhoeniX. GM continued to refuse licensing of the technology in the Saab 9-5 and 9-4X, so these models would not be produced.

In August 2012, Scania AB announced that the griffin logo used in both Scania's and Saab Automobile's trademark would not be allowed for use on future Saab cars with NEVS as the owner of Saab Automobile. Scania believed the logo is of high value in China and feared that it would end up in the wrong hands through the Chinese interests behind NEVS.

In January 2013, due to Sun Investment withdrawing from the project, NEVS announced a new deal with Qingdao Qingbo Investment Co. Ltd, for a 22% stake in the company. In return, NEVS/Saab would receive SEK 2bn, along with a production facility for models sold in China. Cars sold in North America and most of Europe would continue to be produced at Trollhättan, Sweden. The possibility of using Fiat/Chrysler sourced drive train components for non- electric models was also being examined.

On 12 August 2013, the Saab plant at Trollhättan reopened its doors to welcome back employees for preparations and restructuring of the production line. Production of the existing 9–3 would commence shortly with a new electric motor, while Saab finished the preparations for the new 9-3 Phoenix.

In September 2013, the first pre-production Saab-branded vehicle produced by NEVS rolled off of the assembly line. This model was mostly aesthetically identical to the previous Saab 9-3 and mainly used to test new components and assembly line equipment. NEVS announced a facelift of the exterior to be shown on a finalised production model. On 29 November 2013 NEVS announced that full-scale production would commence on 2 December 2013, having replaced the 20 percent of parts originally sourced from former Saab owner General Motors.

Following negotiations with parts suppliers, small-scale production of the petrol version of the Saab 9-3 resumed in December 2013, with sales focused on the Swedish and Chinese markets. Production stopped in May 2014, initially only short term but was extended many times. According to NEVS, this was due to Qingdao insufficiently financing NEVS operations, forcing owner Kai Johan Jiang to fund operations through private funds as well as through assets in NEVS parent company National Modern Energy Holdings Ltd.

At this time, NEVS reportedly owed around $57 million to creditors, and sought bankruptcy protection with the aim of restructuring the company. Despite protection being granted, Saab revoked the right for NEVS to use the Saab brand name. Despite optimism from NEVS that the name may be re acquired, Saab AB confirmed again in 2016 that it was cancelling the licencing agreement between the two companies, meaning future cars would be produced under the name NEVS.

After securing deals with various Chinese consortiums, including the city of Tianjin, resulting in the construction of a new factory, NEVS was acquired by Chinese conglomerate Evergrande Group in 2019. Evergrande's subsequent financial troubles resulted in NEVS being closed in March 2023, with the company going into "Hibernation Mode" to avoid bankruptcy, essentially liquidating the company.

== Production ==
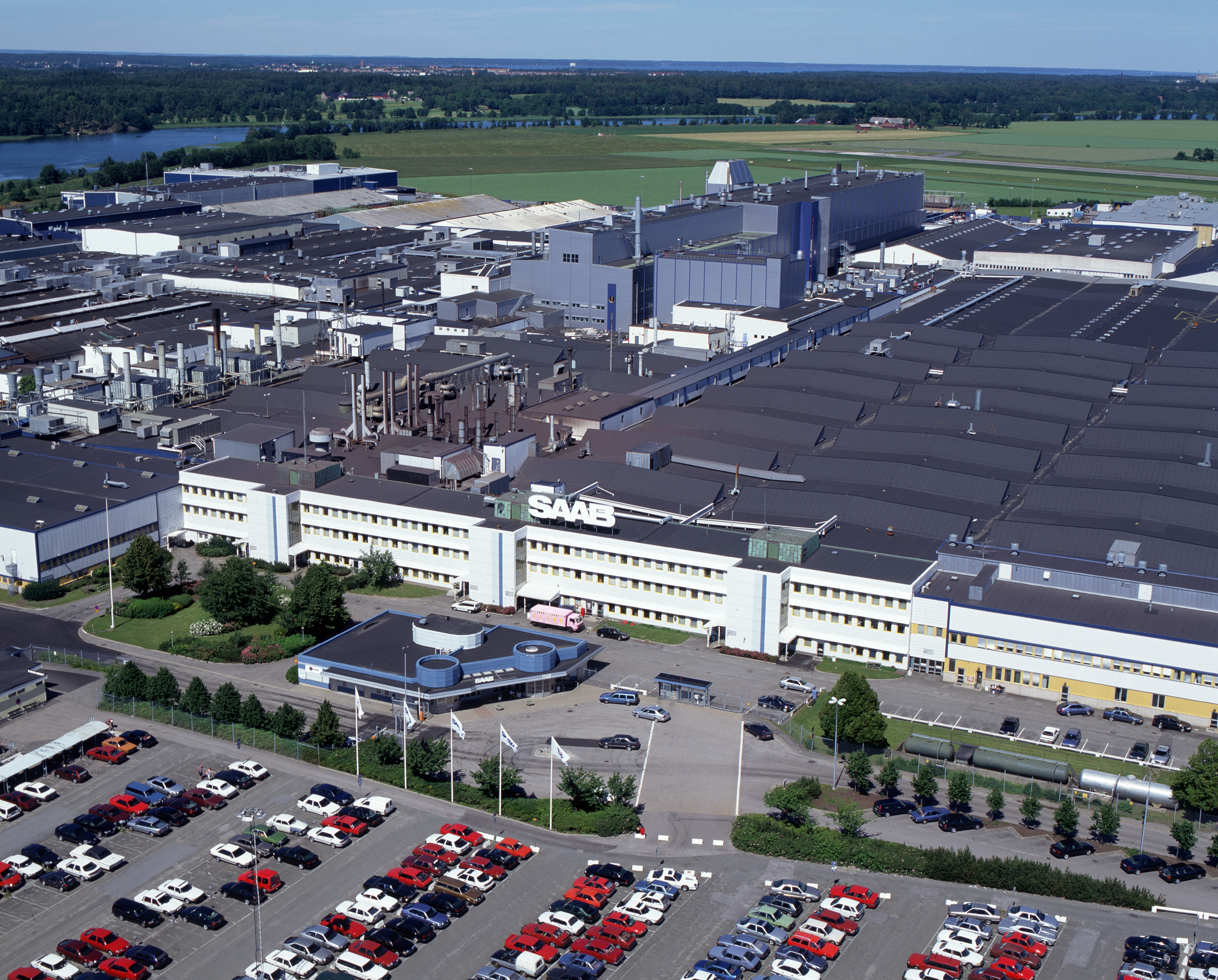
Saab's main production facilities in Trollhättan

Saab's total world production in 2008 was 89,143 Saab vehicles produced in five countries (Sweden, Austria, United States, Mexico and Germany). Production declined sharply in 2009, as new owners struggled to deal with the company's mounting financial problems. Production was suspended until late 2013, when the new ownership launched a limited run of 2014 model year 9-3 sedans.

Production volumes
Year	Volume
2014	380 (NEVS)
2013	71 (NEVS)
2012	0
2011	127,738
2010	32,183
2009	20,821
2008	90,281 (including 1,195 Cadillac BLS produced in Trollhättan)
2007	125,397 (including 2,772 Cadillac BLS produced in Trollhättan)
2006	135,365 (including 3,266 Cadillac BLS produced in Trollhättan)
2005	127,593 (including 123 Cadillac BLS produced in Trollhättan)
2004	128,827
2003	130,034
2002	124,892
2001	123,755
2000	133,013
1999	127,850
1998	124,868
1997	105,114
1996	95,761
1995	97,307
1994	94,084
1993	70,961
1992	84,569
1991	80,366
1990	87,356
1989	103,591
1988	120,562
1987	134,112
1986	126,401
1985	111,813
1984	102,018
1983	96,012
1982	83,557
1981	66,392
1980	65,754
1979	83,758
1978	72,516
1977	76,498
1976	95,927
1975	90,793
1974	92,554
1973	89,467
1972	83,997
1971	72,960
1970	73,982
1969	61,711
1968	52,551
1967	45,325
1966	37,069
1965	48,517
1964	43,493
1963	40,374
1962	35,890
1961	33,040
1960	26,066
1959	17,836
1958	13,968
1957	9,852
1956	6,321
1955	5,620
1954	5,138
1953	3,424
1952	2,298
1951	2,179
1950	1,246
1949	20
1948	1
1947	2
1946	1

Saab manufactured various models at the Valmet Automotive plant in Uusikaupunki, Finland, between 1969 and 2003, in a joint venture established in 1968 together with Valmet. After 2003 Saab did not manufacture any cars in Finland, as the production of the 9-3 convertible then moved to Graz, Austria. In 2010 production of the 9-3 convertible was moved again to Trollhättan. This marked the first time that Trollhättan manufactured the 9-3 convertible.

== Models ==
A common feature of Saab car types was the use of the number 9 in the model numbers. The final models were the 9-3 and 9-5, both of which were manufactured in Trollhättan, Sweden. Until 2008, the 9-7X was manufactured by GM along with the Chevrolet Trailblazer and its platform-mates. The exception to this naming rule is the Saab-Lancia 600, which was a re-badged Lancia Delta.

In December 2013, Nevs announced that the Saab 9-3 sedan was back in regular production, with convertible, station wagon, and electric models to follow in the next year. Production stopped in 2014.

=== Cancelled models ===
- Saab 98, combi-coupé version of the Saab 96
- Saab 9-2, inspired by the classic Saab 92. Production had been planned for 2014.

=== Historical models ===
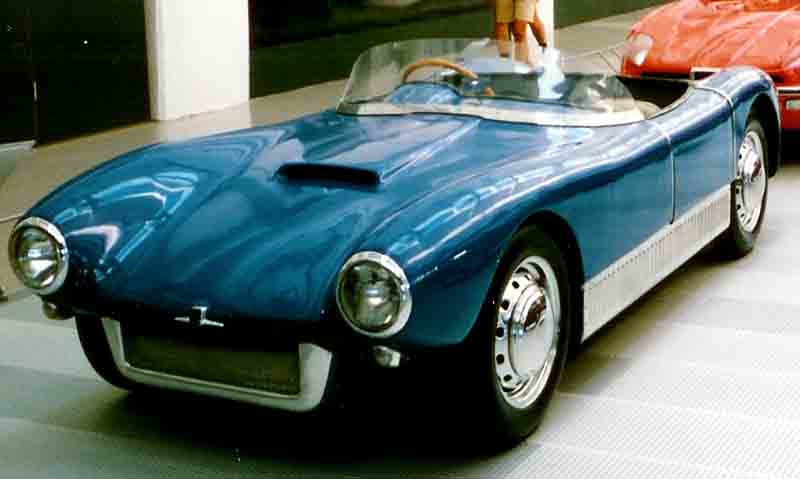
1956 Saab Sonett I

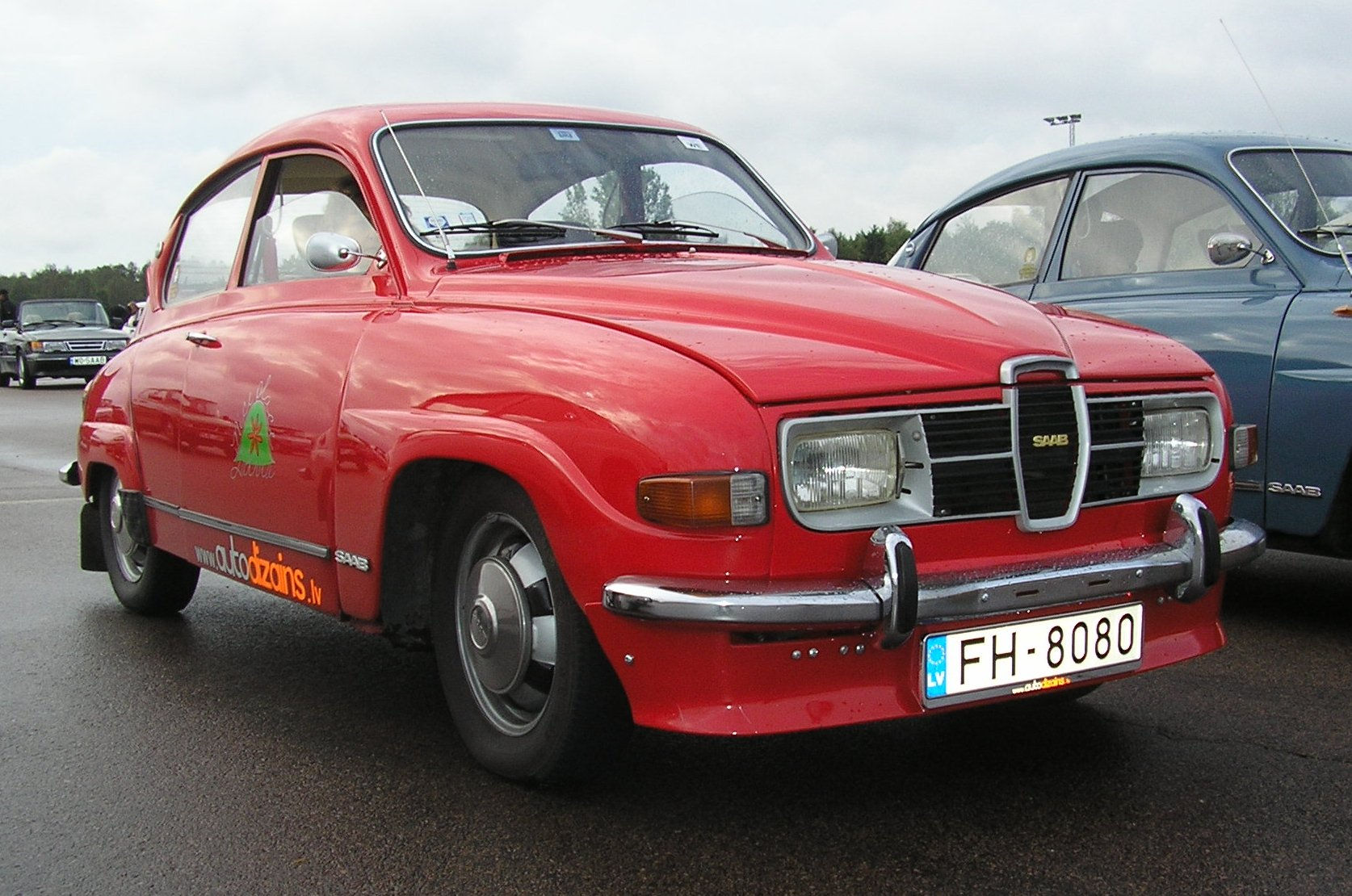
1975 Saab 96

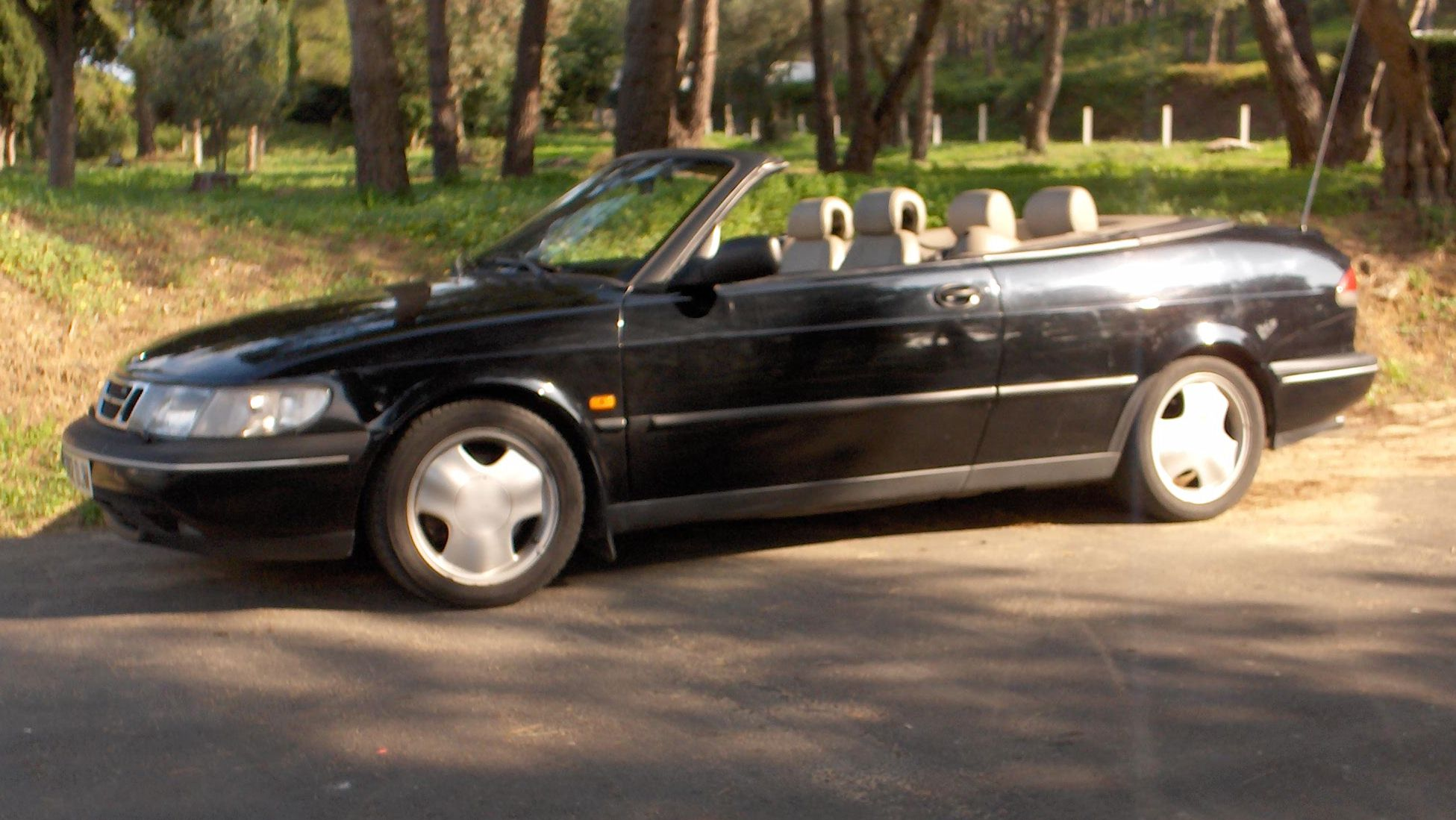
1995 Saab 900SE NG convertible

- Saab 92 and descendants:
  - Saab 92 (1949–1956)
  - Saab 93 (1955–1960)
    - Saab GT750 (1958–1960)
  - Saab 94 Sonett I (1956)
  - Saab 95 estate (1959–1978)
    - Saab 95 3 cylinder two-stroke (1960–1967)
    - Saab 95 V4 (1967–1980)
  - Saab 96 (1960–1980)
    - Saab 96 3 cylinder two-stroke (1960–1968)
    - Saab Sport 3 cylinder two-stroke (1962–1966)
    - Saab Monte Carlo 850 3 cylinder two-stroke (1966–1967)
    - Saab 96 V4 (1967–1980)
    - Saab Monte Carlo V4 V4 (1967–1968)
  - Saab 97
    - Sonett II (1966–1970)
    - Sonett III (1970–1974)
- Saab Formula Junior single seat racing car (1960)
- SaabO caravan/camper/travel trailer (1964–1968)
- Saab 99 and descendants:
  - Saab 99 (1968–1984)
  - Saab 900 "Classic" (1979–1994)
  - Saab 90 (1984–1987)
- Saab 600 (1985–1988)
- Saab 9000 (1985–1998)
- Saab 900 "New Generation" (1994–1998)
- Saab 9-3 first generation (1998–2002)
- Saab 9-2X (2005–2006)
- Saab 9-7X (2005–2009)
- Saab 9-5 first generation (1997–2009)
- Saab 9-3 SportSedan (2002–2011, 2013–2014) second generation
- Saab 9-3 Convertible (2004–2011), (2012 by ANA) second generation
- Saab 9-3 SportCombi (2006–2011) second generation
- Saab 9-3X (2009–2011)
- Saab 9-5 (2010–2011) second generation
- Saab 9-4X (June 2011 – December 2011)

=== Concepts and prototypes ===
- Saab 92 line:
  - Saab 92001 or Ursaab: The prototype for the first Saab production car (1946)
  - Saab Monster (1959)
  - Saab 60 (1962)
  - Saab Quantum (1962)
  - Saab Catherina (1964)
  - Saab MFI13 (1965)
  - Saab Toad (1966)
  - Saab 98 (1974)
- Saab EV-1 (1985)
- Saab 900 line:
  - Saab Viking (1982)
- Saab 9000 line:
  - Saab 9000 Cabriolet
  - Saab Prometheus: A 9000 fitted with a joystick instead of a steering wheel (1993)
- Saab 9XX Concept (1991)
- Saab 9-X line:
  - Saab 9-X (2001)
  - Saab 9-3X (2002)
  - Saab 9-3 Sport Hatch (2003)
  - Saab 9-5 Aero BioPower (2006)
  - Saab 9-4X BioPower (2008)
  - Saab 9-X Biohybrid (2008)
  - Saab 9-X Air (2008)
  - Saab 9-3 ePower sport wagon (2010)
- Saab Aero-X (2006)
- Saab PhoeniX (2011)

== Innovations ==
- 1958: The GT 750 is the first Saab car fitted with seatbelts as standard.
- 1963: Saab becomes the first volume maker to offer diagonally split dual brake circuits.
- 1969: Saab creates an ignition system near the gearstick – instead of behind the steering wheel like most cars – in an attempt to reduce the very common serious and permanent knee injuries during collisions, caused by the knee impacting the key.
- 1970: Saab introduces a world-first – headlamp wipers and washers.
- 1971: Heated front seats are introduced, the first time in the world they are fitted as standard.
- 1971: Saab develops the impact-absorbing, self-repairing bumper.
- 1976: Saab was the first manufacturer to produce a turbo engine with wastegate to control boost.
- 1978: Saab introduces another 'world-first,' the passenger compartment air filter (pollen filter).
- 1980: Saab introduces Automatic Performance Control (APC), and an anti-knock sensor that allowed higher fuel economy and the use of lower grade fuel without engine damage.
- 1981: Saab introduces the split-field side mirror. This reduces the driver's blind spot.
- 1982: Saab introduces asbestos-free brake pads.
- 1983: Saab introduces the 16-valve turbocharged engine
- 1985: Saab pioneers direct ignition, eliminating the distributor and spark plug wires.
- 1991: Saab introduces a 'light-pressure' turbo.
- 1991: Saab is the first manufacturer to offer CFC-free air-conditioning.
- 1991: Saab develops its 'Trionic' engine management system, equipped with a 32-bit micro-processor.
- 1993: Saab introduces the 'Sensonic clutch' and the 'Black Panel', later to be called the 'Night Panel'.
- 1993: Saab develops the 'Safeseat' rear passenger protection system.
- 1994: Saab introduces the 'Trionic T5.5' engine management system, its processor is a Motorola 68332.
- 1995: Saab presents an asymmetrically turbocharged V6 at the Motor Show in Frankfurt am Main, Germany.
- 1996: Saab introduces active head restraints (SAHR), which help minimise the risk of whiplash.
- 1997: Saab introduces Electronic Brake-force Distribution
- 1997: Saab fits ventilated front seats to their new 9-5.
- 1997: Saab introduces ComSense; an alert delay feature that reduces the risk of distraction by briefly postponing lower priority alerts when the brakes or indicators are activated
- 2000: Saab introduces SVC; a Variable Compression, an engine in which the compression ratio is varied by tilting the cylinder head in relation to the pistons.
- 2002: Saab developed an independent, multi-link, rear suspension system on the new Saab 9-3 known as "ReAxs", a system which provides crisp steering feedback and contributes to enhanced driving stability in curves
- 2002: Saab unveils the second-generation Saab Active Head-Restraint system, known as SAHR2, in the new Saab 9-3 sedan
- 2003: Saab introduces CargoSET; automatic storage well retraction for the convertible, a two-step tonneau action for quicker soft-top deployment
- 2008: Saab introduces Cross-wheel drive, an advanced all-wheel drive system with eLSD. Saab brands this systems as "XWD"

== Safety ==
Safety has a high priority in the design of Saab cars. The cars are subjected to the Älgtest (elk test) as elk are a common cause of accidents in Sweden. Saab have compiled a database containing over 6,100 real-life accidents with Saabs. The first recorded event was in 1948 where Julian Shermis had an accident.

== Endurance records ==
In October 1986, the Saab Long Run took place. Three standard Saab 9000 Turbos set two world records and 21 international records at the Talladega Superspeedway in Talladega, Alabama, United States. 100,000 km (62,000 mi) were covered with an average speed of 213.299 km/h (132.537 mph) and 50,000 miles (80,000 km) with an average speed of 213.686 km/h (132.778 mph).

Ten years later, in 1996, three standard Saab 900 (NG) Turbos driven by factory test drivers and two standard naturally aspirated Saab 900s driven by journalists set new world records on the same speedway.

In early December 2006, a Wisconsin traveling salesman donated his 1989 Saab 900 SPG (Special Performance Group) to the Wisconsin Automotive Museum after amassing 1,001,385 miles (1,611,573 km) on the original factory engine. This mileage was verified by Saab.

== Marketing and ownership ==
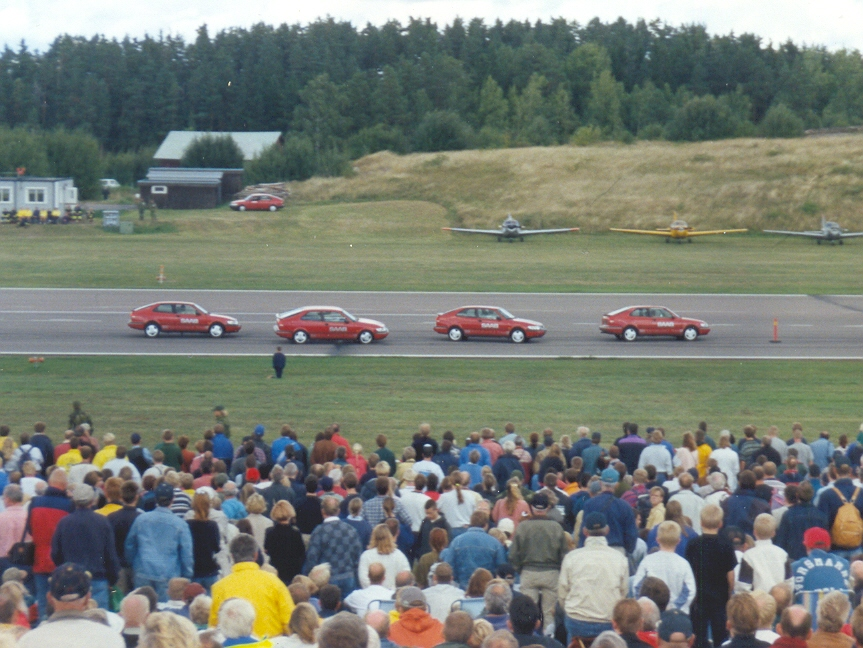
Saab Performance Team at Linköping, in 1997 (Saab 91 Safirs in background)

Dating back to 1937, Svenska Aeroplan AB (Saab) created airplanes, introducing its first car, the Saab 92001, in 1947. Currently, Saab AB is separate from Saab Automobile and is best known for its old Saab 37 Viggen fighter aircraft (the Viggen badge would be shared by a 9-3) and its successor, the current export success low cost JAS 39 Gripen swing-role fighter. This has led to an ad campaign, "Born From Jets", evoking the days when Saab produced both aircraft and automobiles. Saab is imported into many countries; each has a president of the subsidiary or importer. In the US, the first president was Mr. R. Millet.

In 1983, British commercial director Tony Scott made an advertisement for the company where a Saab 900 Turbo is shown racing a Saab 37 Viggen fighter jet. In 1987, Saab created a TV advertisement called "Saab suite" (subtitled Ballet in 3 acts for 8 Saab 9000 Turbos). In the film, stunt drivers show incredible driving with stock cars, such as one-wheeled burnouts, bumper-to-bumper driving through a slalom, cars slaloming from opposite directions on the same course, two-wheel driving, sliding in full speed, and jumping over passing cars—all on a closed airport runway with classical music playing in the background.

To commemorate its 40th anniversary, Saab formed a Performance Team in 1987, which laid on exhibitions of automobile acrobatics and formation driving. Initially this was done with Saab 9000s, as above, then later models, such as the Saab 900 (NG) were used. All of the team's members have previously competed in rallies, but what's unusual is that all five Performance Team members held regular jobs at Saab: there are two engineers, a quality controller, a technician and the head of Saab's photo studio. The picture shows these vehicles on display at the Diamond Jubilee celebrations of the Saab Aircraft Company, at Linköping, in 1997.

A Hewlett-Packard CPU-support chip features a Saab 900 Turbo 16 Cabriolet etched into its structure.

=== Ownership and brand loyalty ===
As the brand has an unusual image in most markets, Saab owners tend to be correspondingly offbeat: intellectuals and enthusiasts. In his studies of brand communities, Albert Muniz, professor of marketing at DePaul University in Chicago, found significant characteristics of Saab owners which he called Snaabery. These included ownership of an original, pre-GM Saab; camaraderie with other Saab drivers and contempt for other brands such as BMW. Writer John Crace characterised the typical "Snaab" as a creative advertising executive with large spectacles and an asymmetric hairstyle. Rüdiger Hossiep, a psychologist at Ruhr University Bochum, found that Saab drivers have the highest level of psychological involvement with their cars, being over 10 times more passionate than the average Volkswagen driver. Saab's main three markets were Sweden, the United Kingdom and the United States.

=== Slogans ===
- The Swedish Car with Aircraft Quality (first English slogan)
- Go Swift – Go Safe – Go Saab (advertisement page – 1970s FIA Year Book)
- The most intelligent cars ever built. (1980s)
- Find your own road. (1990s)
- A Saab will surrender its own life to save yours. (1990s)
- Welcome to the State of Independence (early 2000s decade; United States)
- Born From Jets. (2003–2009; United States, Canada)
- Move Your Mind. (final global slogan)
- People Who Test Drive a Saab, Usually Buy One
- It's A Pity Other Cars Aren't Built This Way
- We don't make compromises. We make Saabs.
- Saab. It's what a car should be.
- Beyond the conventional (1990s United Kingdom).
- The Command Performance Car.
- The Well-Built Swede

== In motorsport ==
Saab competed in the Trans Am Series in 1966, entering a 96 and a 850. Saab also entered its 9-3 in the Castrol Canadian Touring Car Championship.

In 1978 and 1979, Don Knowles won SCCA National Championships in the Showroom Stock B class driving a Saab 99. In 1980, Knowles and Bill Fishburne won the inaugural Longest Day of Nelson 24-hour endurance race in a Saab 900 Turbo.

Saab had a factory rally team with successful drivers, Erik "On-the-Roof" Carlsson, Tom Trana, Simo Lampinen, Stig Blomqvist and Per Eklund. The team stopped competing in 1980. In 2012 a new Saab rally team took part in the classic historic Midnattssolsrallyt (Rally to the Midnight Sun). The S2AB Historic Rally team entered four Saab 99 Turbos, driven by ex-champions Ola Strömberg, Erik Uppsäll, Travis Decker and Jörgen Trued. S2AB (Swedish Advanced Automotive Business) is the company led by Magnus Roland, former chassis manager at Saab.

== See also ==
- Barber Saab Pro Series
- Saab Car Museum
- Saab hockey stick
- Saab Turbo Mobil Challenge
- Saab XWD
- Talbot Horizon – replaced the Saab 96 on the Valmet line and used many of the same parts, especially in the interior
- Trionic 8
