= Hockey stick (disambiguation) =

A hockey stick is a stick used to propel the ball or puck in hockey.

Hockey stick may also refer to:

- Field hockey stick, used to propel the ball in field hockey
- Ice hockey stick, used to propel the puck in ice hockey
- Saab hockey stick, styling cue on Saab cars
- Hockey stick graph (global temperature) is a presentation of the global or hemispherical mean temperature record of the past 1000 years
- Underwater hockey stick, used to propel the puck in underwater hockey
- a hockey stick diagram is a diagram that shows the payoff of a call option or a put option with respect to the price of the underlying asset
- a hockey stick procedure turn is the standard way to reverse direction during an instrument landing in aviation
- the name of a step in cha-cha-cha

== See also ==
- Honey dipper
