= National Modern Energy Holdings =

- Company type: Holding company
- Headquarters: Hong Kong

National Modern Energy Holdings Ltd. (NME) is a British Virgin Islands-registered, Hong Kong–based holding company, which owns National Electric Vehicle Sweden (NEVS) together with Japan-based Sun Investment LLC. NEVS acquired the assets of Saab Automobile AB, Saab Automobile Powertrain AB, and Saab Automobile Tools AB from a bankruptcy estate. National Modern Energy Holdings has operations in China, Macau, and Hong Kong. The owner of the holding company and its subsidiaries is the Chinese-Swedish businessman Kai Johan Jiang.

== Other operations ==
Other operations by the holding company are the building of a battery manufacturing plant in Beijing named Beijing National Battery Technology. The battery plant manufactures batteries for a producer of electric urban buses but will later deliver to NEVS for the planned electric vehicle based on the Saab 9-3.
