= NEVS =

Swedish electric vehicle manufacturer

NEVS AB
- Type: Subsidiary
- Industry: Automotive
- Predecessor: Saab's factories and assets
- Founded: 2012; 14 years ago
- Founder: Kai Johan Jiang
- Defunct: 1 June 2026
- Fate: Liquidation
- Headquarters: Trollhättan, Sweden
- Number of locations: Trollhättan
- Key people: Nina Selander (President)
- Products: Automobiles
- Parent: China Evergrande New Energy Vehicle Group
- Website: www.nevs.com

NEVS AB (an abbreviated form of "National Electric Vehicle Sweden") was a Swedish electric car manufacturer which acquired the assets of Saab Automobile from a bankruptcy estate in 2012. After facing numerous financial difficulties, the company laid off most of its employees in March 2023, with both Polestar and EV Electra interested in buying the former Trollhättan factory.

== History ==
=== Acquisition of Saab Automobile ===
NEVS was established by Hong-Kong based energy company National Modern Energy Holdings (NME) and Japanese investment company Sun Investment, for the sole purpose of acquiring Saab's bankruptcy assets. The company's bid was successful and NEVS acquired the main assets of the Saab Automobile bankruptcy estates in August 2012, intending to run an electric vehicle business at the Saab factory in Trollhättan.

NEVS signed a licensing agreement with Saab AB regarding the rights to use the Saab brand name for its future vehicles. The vehicles and related products and services were named Saab, although the former Saab griffin logo was not used, as Scania AB wanted exclusive rights to the logo and feared it may end up in the wrong hands due to its high value.

=== Restart of production ===
Due to the scale of the task, Sun Investment withdrew from the project. This led to NME seeking a financial partnership with the Qingdao Qingbo Investment Company, who would grant NEVS SEK 2 billion in return for a 22% stake in the company. A factory was also planned in the vicinity of Qingdao. In September 2013, NEVS began manufacturing pre-production Saab 9-3's at the Trollhättan assembly plant to calibrate assembly equipment and test new components. The only exterior difference was the lack of the Griffin badge, which was replaced with a badge displaying the Saab logotype. During this time, 347 employees were reported to be working at the Trollhättan plant.

Following negotiations with parts suppliers, limited production of the petrol-powered Saab 9-3 Aero commenced in December 2013, with 20% of original General Motors parts having been replaced. Around 10 cars a week were planned to be produced for this small-scale test run, with the majority of cars produced being sold in China. NEVS intended to later produce an electric version of the 9–3, hoping to use the sale of petrol and diesel powered versions of the car to finance this.

=== Financial difficulties and abandonment of Saab name ===
NEVS's financial partnership with Qingdao later ended due to the 2013 Qingdao oil pipeline explosion, which weakened the financial state of the city. As a result of this, there were no sufficient financial resources to continue production.

Production of the 9-3 was suspended in May 2014 due to cash flow problems, with NEVS reportedly owing over $57 million to creditors. Struggling to pay its suppliers, the company sought bankruptcy protection with the aim of restructuring. This was initially rejected, but approved in a further attempt. Due to these proceedings, Saab revoked the right for NEVS to use the Saab brand name. NEVS was able to leave bankruptcy protection after its debts were forgiven.

=== Investments from China ===
In May 2015, NEVS took advantage of a campaign launched by the Chinese Government aiming to boost the sale of electric vehicles. The company secured partnerships with the city of Tianjin (THT) and the Beijing State Research Information Technology Company, resulting in the construction of a $400 million factory in Tianjin. NEVS also signed cooperation agreements with Dongfeng Motors and Renesas Electronics, alongside a development contract with the Turkish Institute for Scientific and Technological Research (Tübitak). These partnerships were intended to combine the technical expertise of NEVS engineers with the production capabilities of Dongfeng.

In December 2015, NEVS signed a strategic collaboration agreement with the Chinese company Panda New Energy, an energy vehicle leasing company focusing on limiting emissions. According to the agreement, NEVS would provide Panda with 150,000 9-3 sedan electric vehicles until the end of 2020. These vehicles would be assembled at the new Tianjin factory. NEVS was joined in this agreement by numerous other electric vehicle start-ups, including Faraday Future.

After signing various other industrial partnerships, notably with China Volant Industry Co. (Volinco) in January 2016, and network giant State Grid Electric Services in March 2016, NEVS unveiled its new identity in June during the same year. Saab AB reaffirmed that NEVS would not be allowed to use the Saab brand on future car models, with NEVS announcing that it would abandon any reference to Saab while integrating the heritage of the company. NEVS later signed a battery contract with Contemporary Amperex Technology in 2017.

In autumn 2017, the new managing director of NEVS, Stefan Tilk, signed a preliminary contract with the Chinese vehicle hire company DiDi, which was to invest $500 million in NEVS in order to develop vehicles for its own fleet. The deal subsequently collapsed due to DiDi receiving a cheaper offer from Beijing Automotive Group in the summer of 2018. Despite this, contracts with Volinco and Panda New Energy remained in place.

In March 2018 it was announced that the Chinese investment group GSR Capital was investing $500 million in NEVS to develop and produce batteries in Trollhättan and China. GSR Capital had already taken over Nissan's battery division in 2017.

=== Acquisition by Evergrande Group and subsequent partnerships ===
In January 2019, Chinese real estate conglomerate Evergrande acquired 51% of the shares in NEVS via its listed subsidiary Evergrande Health Industry Group. In addition to the existing Trollhättan and Tianjin plants, another factory was planned in Shanghai.

In the same month, NEVS and Koenigsegg announced that NEVS would acquire a 20% stake in Koenigsegg for $150 million, with both companies entering a “strategic partnership”. The stated aim of this partnership was for Koenigsegg to use the production and supply capabilities of NEVS and Evergrande, with both companies combining their knowledge to develop future vehicle platforms. Koenigsegg has since bought the stake back from NEVS.

In April 2019, Munich based start-up Sono Motors announced that the Sion vehicle would be produced under a contract with NEVS in Trollhättan from the second half of 2020. The deal was later cancelled after Sono signed a binding agreement with another manufacturer. The project was later cancelled due to a lack of funds.

In 2020, NEVS revealed the Sango self driving vehicle as part of its PONS project. The project was intended to act as an autonomous ride-sharing network providing similar levels of privacy and security to a personal vehicle. NEVS partnered with Californian start-up AutoX with the aim of distributing and launching PONS in Sweden. Evergrande Health subsequently announced plans to privatize NEVS by acquiring all its shares, alongside a rebranding the company to China Evergrande New Energy Vehicle Group.

=== Financial troubles and company closure ===
In 2021, it was reported that Evergrande Group was deep in debt, suspected to be due to the COVID-19 pandemic, the failure of the Hengchi project and general mismanagement, and so was trying to sell NEVS to various Chinese investment firms, such as the Xiaomi Consortium. During efforts to sell the company, NEVS revealed the Emily GT, a mid size electric sports sedan developed by engineers over a period of ten months. The purpose of this announcement was to showcase the firm's technology in an effort to secure a buyer. Stefan Tilk was later replaced as CEO by former HR manager Nina Selander.

Despite these efforts to sell the company, NEVS entered a permanent 'hibernation mode' to avoid bankruptcy, essentially liquidating the company.

=== Cancelled deal with EV Electra ===
In May 2023, NEVS sold 80% of the Trollhättan factory to Stenhaga Invest AB, a holding company owned by Swedish millionaire Svante Andersson, with NEVS retaining a 20% share of the property. Stenhaga later announced that they had acquired the remaining 20% stake in the factory, becoming its sole owner.

In July 2023, Auto Motor und Sport magazine reported that a secret investor had signed a letter of intent to purchase both the Emily GT and PONS projects from NEVS. This investor was later revealed to be EV Electra CEO Jihad Mohammad, who announced in December 2023 that his company had purchased the rights to both projects, with the Emily GT being renamed the 'EV Electra Emily GT'. A joint statement between NEVS and EV Electra revealed that EV Electra would soon begin to produce cars in Turkey, with Mohammad adding that cars would soon be produced at Trollhättan again. Despite this, EV Electra failed to secure a development site in Trollhättan, instead purchasing a factory in Italy, leading to NEVS cancelling the agreement. In December 2024, it was revealed that the remaining 20 people working at NEVS had been made redundant.

== Vehicles ==
- 9-3 EV (2013–2014; 2019–2022), a compact electric sedan based on the Saab 9-3.
- Sango, a prototype self-driving 6 passenger vehicle for city mobility.
- Emily GT (2020), a project for an electric sedan designed by Simon Padian.
- Emily GTO, a planned convertible version of the Emily GT.

== See also ==
- EV Electra
- Faraday Future
- Hengchi
- Saab Automobile
- Sono Motors
