= Saab Turbo Mobil Challenge =

The Saab Turbo Mobil Challenge was a British one-make touring race series, run by the British Automobile Racing Club (BARC) in 1987 and 1988. The cars permitted to compete were Saab 900 turbo cars in 10- and 12-lap races. The series was sponsored by the British subsidiaries of Mobil and Saab.

== The cars ==
The cars were capable of 140 mph (225 km/h) and were tuned to production specification, with only Saab sports parts permitted for any adjustments. The wheels were shod with Pirelli racing slick tyres.

Key specifications for race cars were: no chassis modification; front and rear spoilers as standard, with removal of material permitted for engine cooling; ground clearance front 440 mm (17.3 in), rear 400 mm (15.7 in); sump guard prohibited; engines conforming to Saab-Scania standard H-series Turbo specification, as from model year 1986; oil and water cooler matrices standard; control of wastgate was 'free'; air filter box, element and throttle housing standard; exhaust manifold standard; exhaust system after the manifold was 'free'; the APC system could be deleted; fuel injection equipment standard, with permitted modifications; Saab roadholding kit fitted; Saab anti-roll bar kit fitted; permitted to alter front and rear wheel geometry; clutch uprated to an AP Racing unit; gearbox standard for 1986 model year; Saab-supplied wheels only; specified brake modifications permitted; handbrake could be removed; fuel tank standard; standard power-steering to be retained.

== The drivers ==
Drivers raced in either of two classes, Professional or Amateur. Points were awarded as follows: 10 for a win; 9 for 2nd place; 8 for 3rd place etc. down to 1 for 10th place. An extra point was awarded to the drivers who achieved a pole position or fastest race lap.

In 1988, the drivers (with end-of-season points) were:

- Professional – Lionel Abbott (31), Adrian Cottrell (10), Andy Dawson (60), Tony Dron (28), Mark Hales (7), Robert Koistenen (9), John Llewellyn (46), Gerry Marshall (15) and Charles Tippet (99).
- Amateur – Mike Bennion (13), Simon Butler (76), Jonathan Collett-Jobey (2), Simon Fenning (30), David Field (6), James Latham (72), John Myerscough (73), Folke Sarnmark (15), Mick Tester (64), James Tucker (47), Kari Uusitupa (4), and Richard Wardle (34).

== The races ==
The 12 rounds of the 1988 challenge were run at:

- Thruxton – 4 April
- Silverstone – 17 April
- Donington – 24 April
- Brands Hatch – 22 May
- Thruxton – 30 May
- Oulton Park – 11 June
- Donington – 3 July
- Snetterton – 31 July
- Brands Hatch – 4 September
- Snetterton – 18 September
- Oulton Park – 8 October
- Thruxton – 16 October

== The champion ==
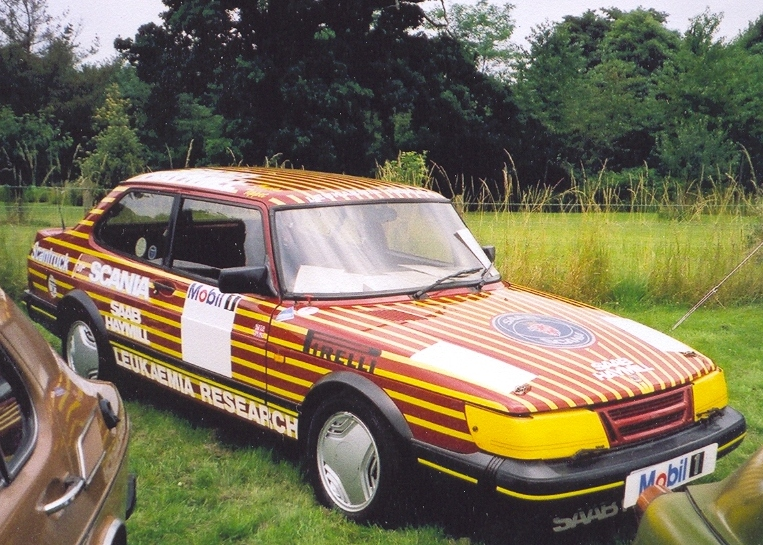
The 1988 Champion, driven by Charles Tippet

The overall winner (1988 Champion) was Charles Tippet, driving for Saab Haymill, based in Farnham Common, UK. On his way, he scored four race wins and three lap records. His car was in red livery with yellow stripes and raced as No. 28. It is the only survivor of the participating vehicles and is preserved in Oxfordshire, England.

The racing livery included advertisements for Scania, Scantruck, Saab Haymill, Pirelli and Mobil. The driver's name and the names of the service crew were also displayed and remain on the preserved motor car. In addition, some minor bodywork damage can still be seen, acquired during racing. There was a particularly dramatic incident at Donington, on 3 July, in which No. 28 was repeatedly struck by John Llewellyn's car and was eventually forced to spin off.

The Amateur Champion in 1988 was David Field (6), driving the blue and yellow McNaughton Ross Sponsored Car. After a season long battle with Simon Butler (Kentish Saab), Field won the Championship by a single point obtained by virtue of "fastest lap" in the final race of the season, at Thruxton.

== Other drivers ==
Following the series Lionel Abbott, along with his brother Ed, went on to establish the company Abbott Racing. The Essex-based family business specialises in modifications to, and racing preparation of, many late Saab models, in particular the turbocharged models from the 1980s onwards.
