= Saab 9-X Biohybrid =

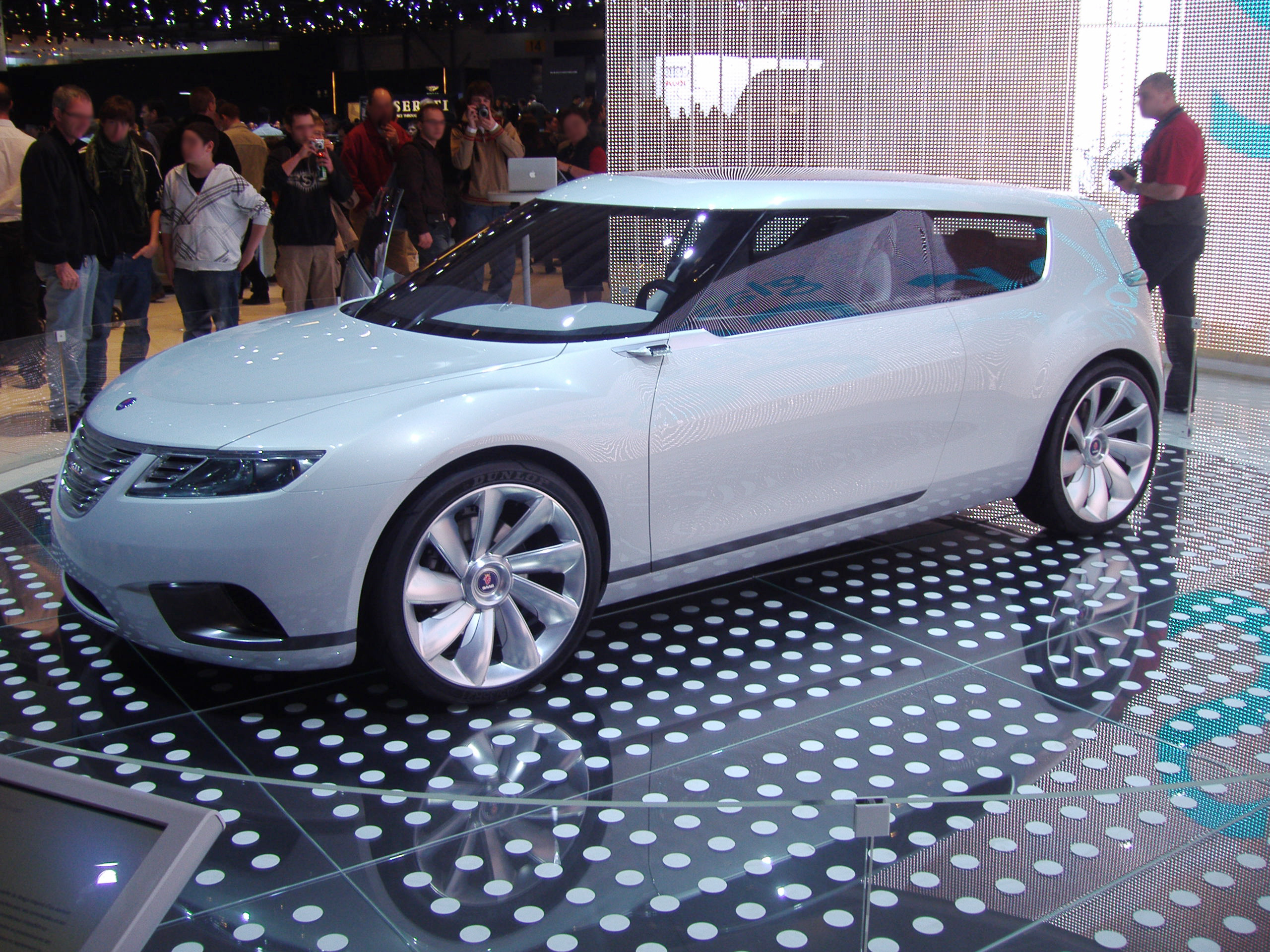
The Saab 9-X Biohybrid Concept Vehicle at the 2008 Geneva Motor Show

The Saab 9-X Biohybrid concept car was developed by Saab in 2008, and first shown at the Geneva Motor Show. It is based on the GM Delta platform, and was thought to give an idea of the cancelled Saab 9-1X.

It has keyless entry and small cameras instead of rear-view mirrors. On the roof, there is a solar panel, like in the Saab EV-1, for charging the battery, both when driving and when parked. The headlights are automatic. A front mounted camera detects if you meet another car.

The front of the car follows the design of the Saab Aero-X while the rear has a cut off look, similar to the Saab 9-X. It is powered by a direct injected, E85 flex fuel capable turbocharged inline four cylinder engine of 1.4 liters giving 200 hp (149 kW) at 5000 rpm and 280 N⋅m (207 ft⋅lbf) at 1750-5000 rpm. Connected to the engine by a belt is GM's BAS+ hybrid system which can provide a boost up to 19 hp.

The engine is connected to a manual six speed gearbox with automatic clutch. 0–100 km/h (62 mph) is achieved in 7.9 seconds and it has a top speed of 216 km/h (134 mph). It has four seats although the headroom in the rear is somewhat restricted. As the name suggests, it runs both regular gasoline and E85.

The fuel consumption (running on E85) is 6.41 litres per 100 kilometres (44.1 mpg_{‑imp}; 36.7 mpg_{‑US}) and the tank to wheel CO_{2} emissions are 105 g/km. If driven faster than 70 km/h (43 mph), the rear spoiler is extended and an underbody diffuser is deployed from the bottom of the rear bumper. When braking at speeds above 100 km/h (62 mph), the spoiler acts like an air brake and also is used to increase the downforce of the car.
