= Saab 9-2 =

Overview
- Manufacturer: Saab (Spyker Cars)
- Also called: Saab 9-1
- Production: Cancelled due to bankruptcy

Body and chassis
- Class: Small family car (C)
- Body style: 3-door coupe
- Layout: FF layout

Chronology
- Predecessor: Saab 9-2X

The Saab 9-2 (sometimes referred to as Saab 9-1) was a small family car that was proposed in February 2010 to have been added to Saab's production line by 2014, under its then new ownership, Spyker Cars though some commentators considered the project a pipe dream.

The 9-2 was thought to have been developed in a joint venture with another automaker, probably European. Although little is known about the design, those who have seen it report it is the same teardrop shape as the 1949 to 1956 Saab 92, but also futuristic with the front similar to the new Saab 9-5. Saab Managing Director Jan-Åke Jonsson said the model would likely not be on the global GM Gamma platform.

Speculation in August 2009 suggested that the new small Saab would be based on the Saab 9-X Biohybrid concept car, which was shown at the 2008 Geneva Auto Show, and expected to compete with other premium small cars such as the Mini.
