= Kai Johan Jiang =

Swedish-Chinese businessman

Kai Johan Jiang (born 1965 as Jiang Dalong (蒋大龙)) is a Swedish-Chinese businessman and company operator with business interests in Sweden and China. In 2004, Jiang founded State Power (Dragon Power Company), a Chinese energy company active in the sustainable energy sources, mainly biomass. He is the CEO of State Power Group.

Jiang was the CEO of National Electric Vehicle Sweden AB (NEVS), formed in 2012 with the intention to acquire the main assets of Saab Automobile AB from the bankruptcy estate. The acquisition was finalized on August 31, 2012. In July 2020 Jiang stepped down as CEO and sold his remaining shares in NEVS, which then became wholly owned by the Chinese property developer Evergrande Group.

Among Jiang's other business interests in Swedish industry is NBE Sweden AB, a company that plans to build an energy combine in Sveg in Härjedalen. His plans include a 150 MW cogeneration plant fueled by biomass and an ethanol plant with annual output of up to 80,000 tonnes.

Jiang is an economic adviser to the government of Shandong province of China. Jiang worked for ICBC and served as senior advisor to the Volvo Group from 1993 to 2000. In 2008 he was awarded the prize "Emerging Entrepreneur Of The Year" by Ernst & Young in China.
