= Saab hockey stick =

Automotive design feature seen on nearly all Saab automobiles

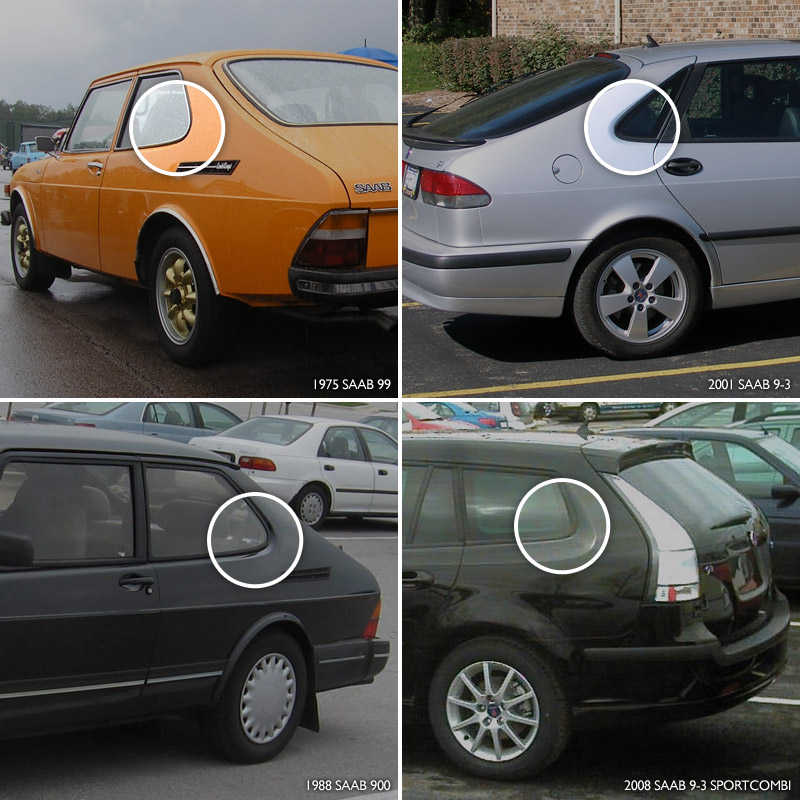
Examples of Saab hockey stick designs.

The hockey stick is an automotive design feature seen on nearly all Saab automobiles. It is a C-pillar curve from the base of the rear passenger window that resembles the shape of an ice hockey stick or the Nike Swoosh symbol.

The distinctive design cue first appeared on the Saab 92 and was kept in the Saab 93 and Saab 96. When the Saab 99 was launched in the late 1960s it kept this design feature. and has since appeared on most Saab models, including the classic Saab 900, and later models such as the Saab 9-5 and the 9-3 SportCombi.

== See also ==
- Hofmeister kink - a similarly unique styling feature found on modern era BMWs.
