= Saab Viking =

Swedish concept car

The Saab Viking is a concept car designed by the Italian company Carrozzeria Fissore and presented in 1982. The concept was designed by Tom Tjaarda. The Viking is based on a Saab 900 Turbo chassis.
