= Rover SD1 =

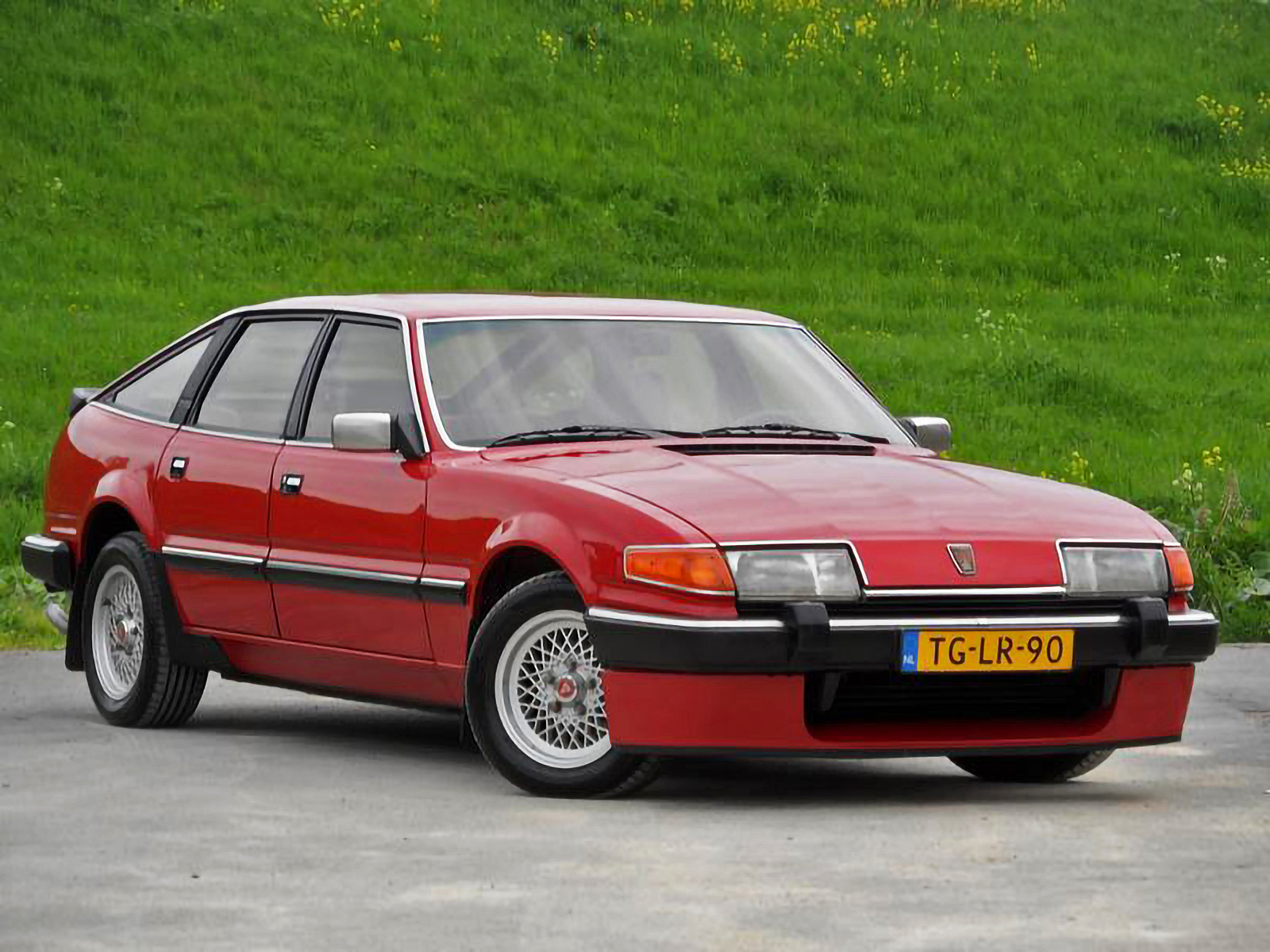
- 1985 Rover 3500 Vitesse

Overview
- Manufacturer: British Leyland (Rover marque)
- Also called: Standard 2000 (India)
- Production: 1976–1986; 1985–1988 (India); 303,345 produced
- Assembly: United Kingdom: Castle Bromwich; United Kingdom: Cowley, Oxford; United Kingdom: Solihull, West Midlands; India: Chennai (Standard); New Zealand: Nelson (NZMC); South Africa: Blackheath (Leykor: CKD)
- Designer: David Bache & Spen King

Body and chassis
- Class: Executive car (E)
- Body style: 5-door hatchback/fastback
- Layout: Front-engine, rear-wheel-drive

Powertrain
- Engine: Petrol: 1994 cc O-Series I4; 2350 cc Leyland PE166 I6; 2597 cc Leyland PE166 I6; 2622 cc BMC E-series I6 (ZA); 3528 cc Rover V8; Diesel: 2393 cc VM Motori HR 492 OHV I4
- Transmission: 3-speed GM TH180 automatic 5-speed Leyland LT77 manual

Dimensions
- Wheelbase: 110.8 in (2,814 mm)
- Length: 185 in (4,699 mm)
- Width: 69.6 in (1,768 mm) Wheel Track 60 in (1,524 mm)
- Height: 54 in (1,372 mm)

Chronology
- Predecessor: Rover P6; Triumph 2000
- Successor: Rover 800 series

The Rover SD1 is an executive car which was manufactured by British Leyland (BL) from 1976 until 1986 and marketed under the Rover marque. Sold with a variety of names, the code name "SD1" refers to the "Specialist Division" of BL (later known as the "Jaguar-Rover-Triumph" division), with the "1" denoting it as the first product of their in-house design team. A large five-door hatchback with fastback styling, the SD1 has a front-engine, rear-wheel-drive layout and was sold with various petrol engines, including the Rover V8, as well as a diesel engine.

The SD1 was introduced as a replacement for the Rover P6 and Triumph 2000 models, and in 1977 it won the European Car of the Year title. It continued to be produced by the Austin-Rover division after BL was reorganised in 1982, and eventually was replaced by the Rover 800 series in 1986. The SD1 was the final Rover-badged vehicle to be produced at Solihull. Future Rover models would be built at the former British Motor Corporation factories at Longbridge and Cowley. It was also produced under licence in Chennai, India as the Standard 2000 from 1985 to 1988.

== History ==
=== Background ===
In 1971, Rover, at that time a part of the British Leyland (BL) group, began developing a new car to replace both the Rover P6 and the Triumph 2000/2500. The designers of both Triumph and Rover submitted proposals for the new car known as the Triumph Puma and Rover P10 respectively, of which the latter was chosen. David Bache was to head the design team, inspired by exotic machinery such as the Ferrari Daytona and 365 GTC/4, and the late 1960s design study by Pininfarina for the BMC 1800, which also guided the design of the Citroën CX. Spen King was responsible for the engineering. The two had previously collaborated on the Range Rover. The project was first code-named RT1 (for Rover Triumph Number 1) but then soon changed to SD1 (for Specialist Division Number 1) as Rover and Triumph were put in the new "Specialist Division" of British Leyland.

=== Design ===
The new car was designed with simplicity of manufacture in mind in contrast to the P6, the design of which was rather complicated in areas such as the De Dion suspension. The SD1 used a simple beam axle instead. Also, the other vehicle being replaced, the Triumph 2000, had fully independent rear suspension. This different approach was chosen because surveys showed that although the automotive press was impressed by sophisticated and revolutionary designs, the general buying public was not unless the results were good. However, with the live rear axle came another retrograde step – the car was fitted with drum brakes at the rear.

Rover's plans to use a new 2.2-litre DOHC 16-valve Slant-Four engine with Bosch L-Jetronic fuel injection were soon abandoned as BL management ruled that substantially redesigned versions of Triumph's six-cylinder engine were to power the car instead. The Rover V8 engine was fitted in the engine bay. The three-speed automatic gearbox was the BorgWarner 65 model.

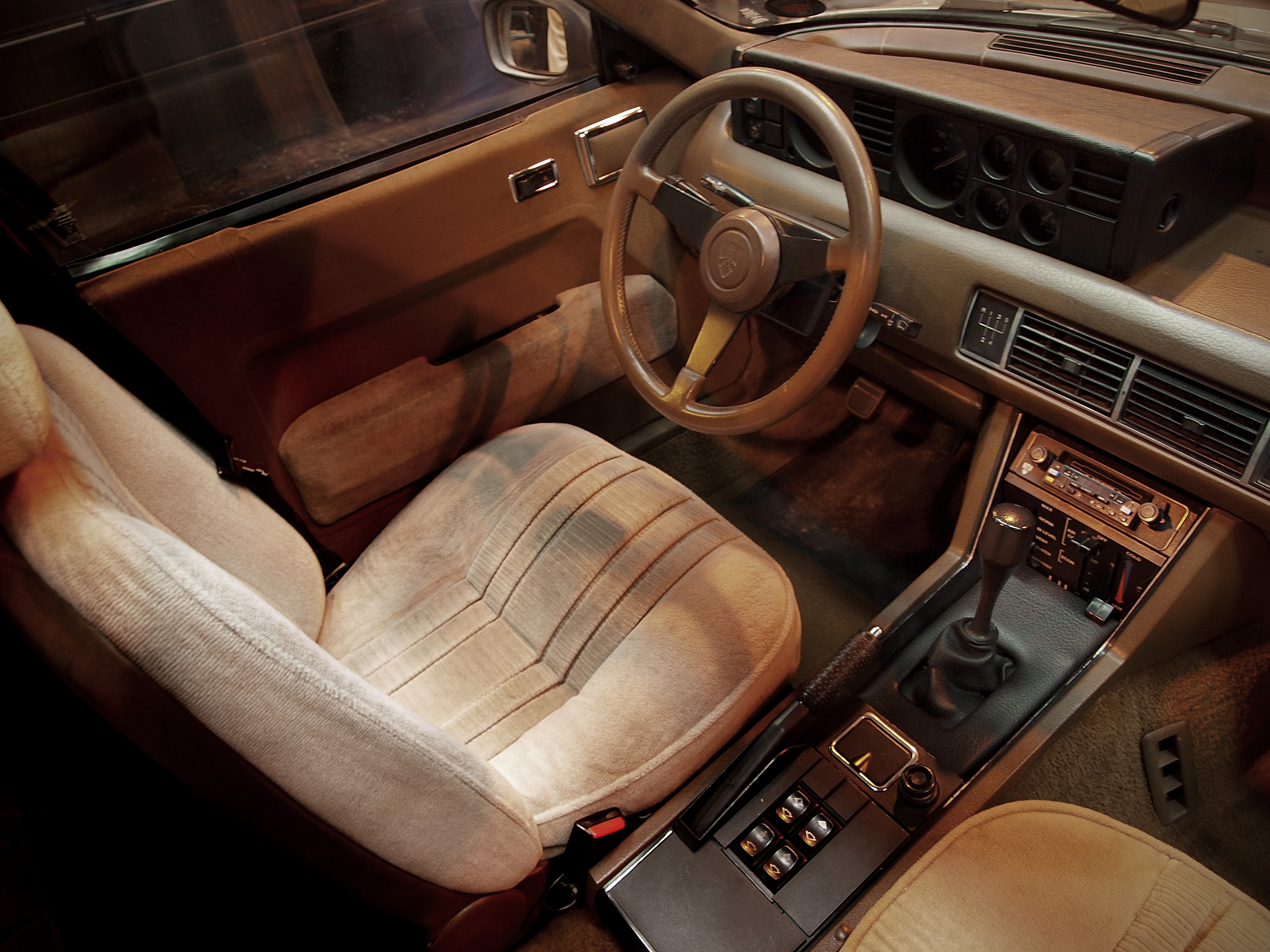
LHD Rover SD1 NOS series 1 interior featuring a circular steering wheel exclusive to American models

The dashboard of the SD1 features an air vent, unusually, directly facing the passenger. The display binnacle sits on top of the dashboard in front of the driver to aid production in left-hand drive markets, since it avoided the expense of producing two different dashboard mouldings for LHD and RHD versions. The air vent doubles as a passage for the steering-wheel column, and the "podular" display binnacle can be easily fitted on top of the dashboard on either the left or right-hand side of the car. This concept was not entirely new; it had also been used on the Range Rover and was used again on the Mk.1 Austin Metro, both of which were also designed by David Bache. The interior of the Series 1 was notable for its lack of wood embellishment in comparison to previous Rover saloons, with an extensive use instead of modern soft-feel plastics, and a new "skeletal" version of the Rover badge would appear on the bonnet - Bache was keen that the SD1 should make use of the latest industrial design trends and be a clean break from the past.

An estate body had been envisaged, but it did not get beyond the prototype stage. Two similarly specified estates have survived, and are exhibited at the Heritage Motor Centre and the Haynes International Motor Museum respectively. One was used by BL chairman Sir Michael Edwardes as personal transport in the late 1970s. The two cars as befit prototypes differ in the detail of and around the tailgate. One car has a recessed tailgate, while the other has a clamshell arrangement, where the whole tailgate is visible when closed.

The SD1 was intended to be produced in a state-of-the-art extension to Rover's historic Solihull factory alongside the TR7. It was largely funded by the British government, who had bailed BL out from bankruptcy in 1975. Unfortunately, this did nothing to improve the patchy build quality that then plagued all of British Leyland. That, along with quick-wearing interior materials and poor detailing ensured that initial enthusiasm soon turned to disappointment.

=== Series 1 (1976–1982) ===
This car was launched on its home market in June 1976 in hatchback/fastback form only, as the V8-engined Rover 3500: SOHC 2.3 L and 2.6 L sixes followed in November 1977, when the Rover P6 and Triumph 2000 were finally discontinued. Although there was no four-cylinder version of the SD1 at this point, British Leyland produced 1.8, 2.0 and 2.2 versions of the smaller Princess in order to compete with the entry-level versions of the Ford Granada, as well as more expensive versions of the Ford Cortina.

The car was warmly received by the press and even received the European Car of the Year award for 1977. Its launch on the European mainland coincided with its appearance at the Geneva Motor Show in March 1977, some three months after the Car of the Year announcement. Dealers had no left-hand drive cars for sale, however, since production had been blocked by a tool makers' strike affecting several British Leyland plants and a "bodyshell dispute" at the company's Castle Bromwich plant. Closer to home, the car and its design team received The Midlander of the Year Award for 1976, because they had between them done most in the year to increase the prestige of the (English) Midlands region.

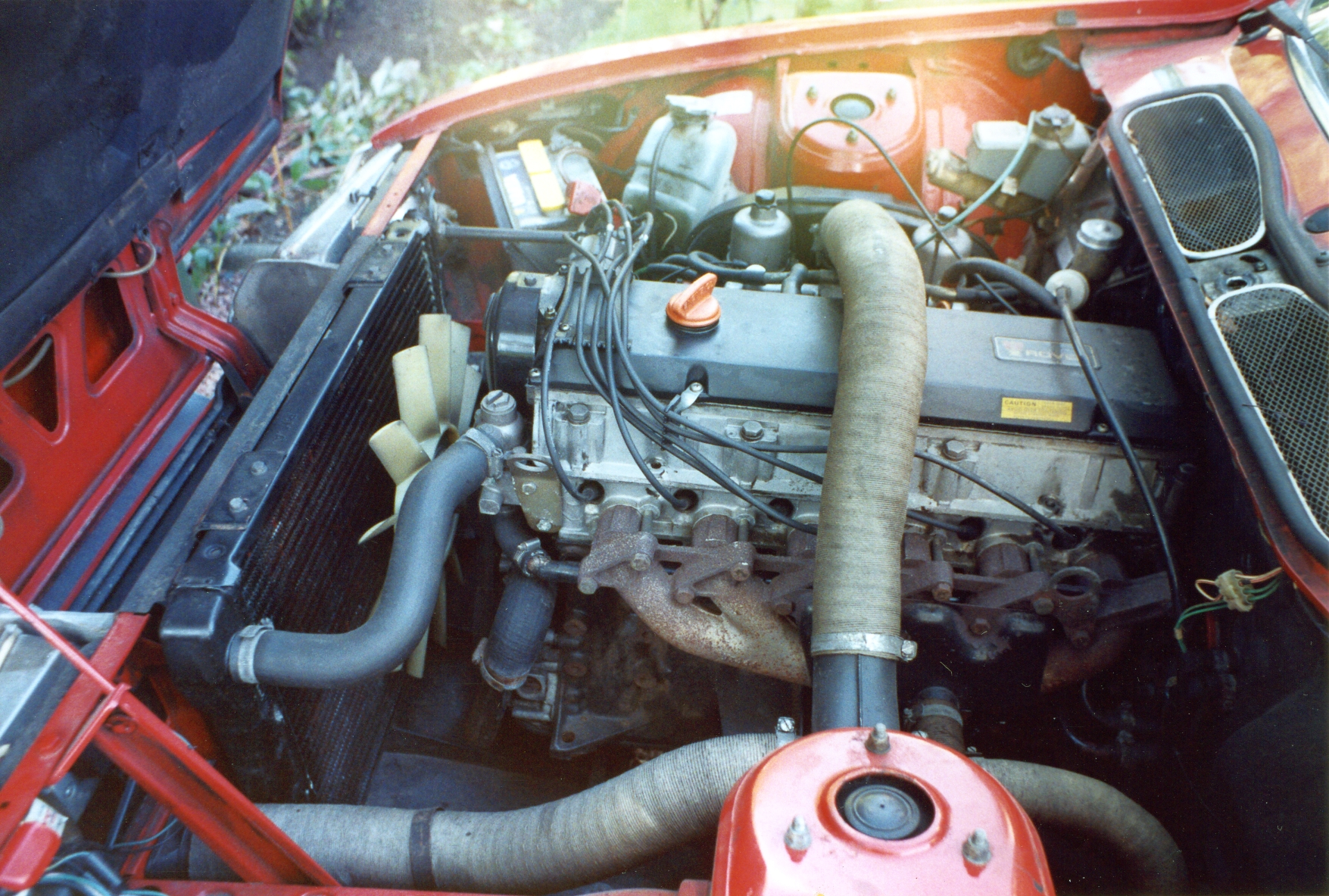
Rover 2300 six-cylinder engine, in situ in SD1

Poor construction quality was apparent even in the company's press department fleet. The British magazine Motor published a road test of an automatic 3500 in January 1977, and while keen to highlight the Rover's general excellence, they also reported that the test car suffered from poor door seals, with daylight visible from inside past the rear door window frame's edge on the left side of the car, and a curious steering vibration at speed which might have resulted from the car's front wheels not having been correctly balanced. Disappointment was recorded that the ventilation outlet directly in front of the driver appeared to be blocked, delivering barely a breeze even when fully open; the writer had encountered this problem on one other Rover 3500, although he had also driven other cars of the same type with an abundant output of fresh air through the vent in question. Nevertheless, in March 1977, Britain's Autocar was able to publish an article by Raymond Mays – a famous racing driver and team manager during (in particular) the 1930s, 1950s and 1960s – in which Mays explained why, after driving it for 12,000 miles, he considered his Rover 3500 was "the best car he [had] ever had", both for its many qualities as a driver's car and for its excellent fuel economy even when driven hard. Similar ventilation problems persisted until 1980.

Another area of concern was flaking paint on early models, forcing British Leyland to spend a lot of money on repainting cars.

In television shows John Steed in The New Avengers and George Cowley in The Professionals both used yellow Rover 3500 models.

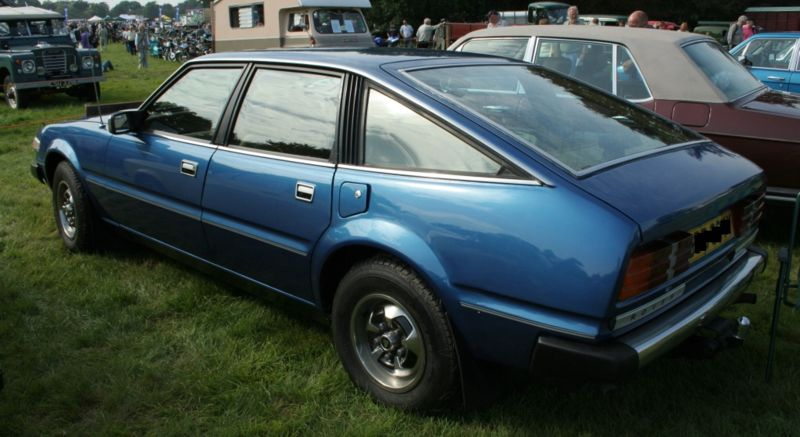
Rover 3500 (with badging and chrome door mirrors of the late pre-facelift cars)

==== Cosmetic tweaks and range expansion ====
Between 1976 and 1981 there were some very minor updates to the car including new badging (front and rear) and chrome backed door mirrors - the traditional-style Rover Longship emblem returned for the 1981 model year, thus replacing the 'skeletal' version, although the latter continued to be used on the hubcaps, and indeed a variant of this Rover logo was later used as a hubcap emblem on both the later SD3 Rover 200 and Rover 800 models as late as 1989. 1979 also saw the introduction of the then range-topping V8-S model with no mechanical alterations, available in a rather bright metallic "Triton" green amongst others with either gold or silver-painted alloy wheels depending on the body color. Interior specification included air-conditioning, thick luxurious carpets, velour seats and a headlamp wash/wipe system. This now very rare model was replaced in late 1980 with the Vanden Plas (VP) model, which came with a leather interior as standard.

==== North American market models ====
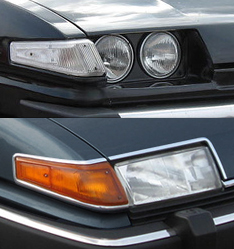
US exposed headlights on top

In 1980 Rover obtained US type approval for the SD1 and re-entered the American market after a ten-year absence. The car was only made available as a single variant, built at the Solihull plant and using a modified version of the V8 engine and badged simply as "Rover 3500". The equipment and trim levels were similar to that of the UK market's then top-of-the-range V8-S model. The main differences were a smaller steering wheel, the manually operated sunroof being a cost option and rear passenger head restraints were not available at all. Small Union Jack badges were fixed to the lower section of each front wing, just ahead of the doors, to promote the car's British origins. Canadian market cars had V8 badges instead of the Union Jack.

The five-speed manual gearbox was supplied as standard, with the three-speed automatic version being a cost option.

US safety legislation (that first applied to the Citroën DS) demanded that the headlamp arrangement exclude the front glass panels. Also larger, heavier bumpers were required, increasing the overall length to 191 inches (4850 mm).

American emissions regulations necessitated replacing the carburetors with Lucas' L-Jetronic fuel injection system, using dual catalytic converters together with a modified exhaust manifold and adding antismog equipment. The engine's compression ratio was modified to 8.13:1.

Beginning in the 1980 model year, the American version of the 3532 cc V8 used in the Triumph TR8 produced 133 hp (99 kW) with carburetors, except in California where it produced 137 hp (102 kW) thanks to fuel injection.

Beginning in June 1980 and through the final, 1981 model year, the American version of the Rover 3500 produced 148 hp SAE (110 kW) at 5100 rpm with fuel injection. This engine variant was also used in the 1981 Triumph TR8. Meanwhile, the carburetted European version of the Rover SD1 produced 155 hp (116 kW). While publicity material claimed it was capable of reaching 148 hp, the car as sold actually peaked at 133 hp (at 5000 rpm).

Fuel injection for the Rover V8, first seen on the California emissions model in late 1979, was introduced later in Europe. The 1982 Rover SD1 Vitesse was launched with 192 hp (143 kW), thanks to additional modifications such as having a hotter camshaft.

Since August 1978, a carbureted engine, with antismog equipment, had already been on sale in Australia with 102 kW (137 hp). Beginning in the 1981 model year, Australia received a version of the fuel injected federalized engine with 106 kW (142 hp).

The SD1 gained positive reviews in the American press and was competitively priced against rivals such as the BMW 5 Series and corresponding Mercedes-Benzes. Despite this, the car still sold poorly, having achieved just 480 sales between its launch in June 1980 and the end of that year. The whole of 1981 attracted 774 sales, although most of these cars had actually been built and stockpiled the previous year.

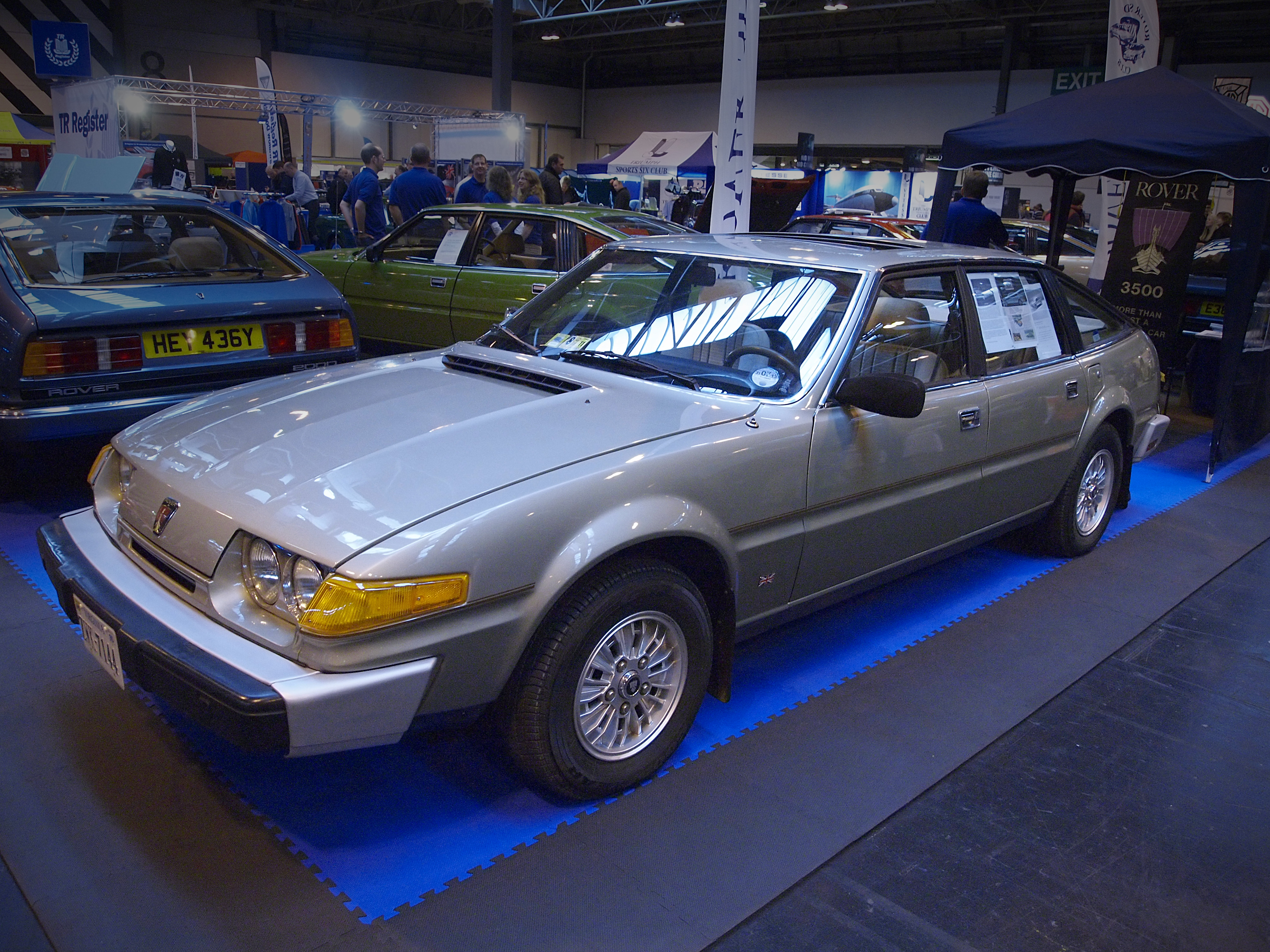
North American Rover 3500

Rover ceased the supply of American market SD1s at the end of 1981, although unsold cars remained available from dealers well into the following year.

Reasons for the commercial failure of the SD1 in the US are open to speculation. The weak value of the American dollar against European currencies at the time rendered imports relatively expensive in comparison to a home-built product. A significant rise in oil prices during 1979 led to many motorists opting for more fuel-efficient cars. Public awareness of the SD1 may have been low as the dealership network across America was small, while Rover's expenditure on the aforementioned modifications, testing, and approval for the US market left limited budget for publicity and advertising. (To save money the official press launch was combined with that of the Triumph TR8.)

==== Production shift ====
Major restructuring of BL following the Ryder Report resulted in the SD1 production line being moved to the former Morris plant in Cowley in 1981. The Solihull plant was turned over to produce Land Rover models, following on from that marque's separation from Rover in 1978. The hugely expensive extension to Solihull, which had been built specifically for the SD1 and Triumph TR7, was mothballed, and was finally brought back into use in 1997 for the Land Rover Freelander and in 2016 for the Jaguar XE and F-PACE.

1981 also saw the beginning of "Project XX" – a venture between BL and Honda for a new executive car expected to replace the SD1, although it was not anticipated for production until the mid-1980s. Project XX ultimately emerged as the Rover 800 Series in 1986 and would be the replacement for the SD1.

=== Series 2 (1982–1986) ===
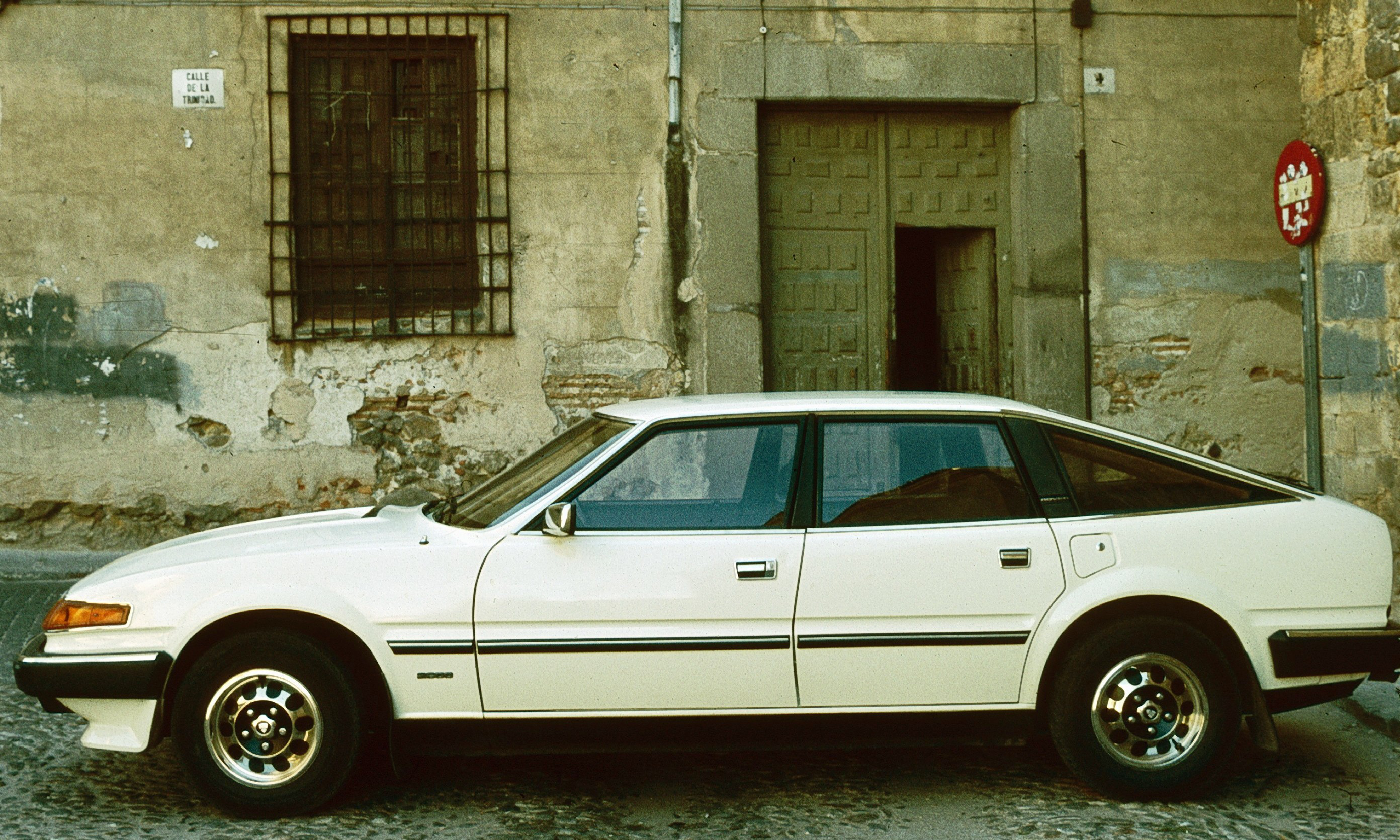
A 1983 Rover 2000 (a Series 2 car with revised headlights, interior, and C-pillars)

Early in 1982, Rover unveiled the Cowley-built, facelifted line to the public (although the final Series 1s were also built at Cowley). These cars benefited mostly from small cosmetic changes on the exterior as well as a quite extensively redesigned interior. The biggest interior change was to the instrument binnacle, which was made both flatter and longer than the original, with the ancillary gauges and digital clock moved out of the driver's line of sight almost over the centre of the dashboard, whilst the dials themselves followed modern practice being under a glass hood instead of being deeply recessed as before. Wood trim on both the dashboard and the door cards were included after criticism that the original interior looked downmarket. Car spotters can distinguish the two series by the headlights, which were chrome-rimmed and flush fitting on the Series 2, recessed on the Series 1, the deeper rear window, now fitted with a rear wash wipe, and the new plastic wrap around bumpers which replaced the three-piece rubber and stainless steel ones. Other details, which are not as easy to assign include the full-width rear badge strip under the tail lights, engine size badges on front wings, and a range of new wheel trims and alloy wheels. The automatic gearbox was now a French built GM Turbo-Hydramatic 180 model ( TH180 ), still offering three speeds but better ratios. The electric window switch pack moved from the centre console to the driver's door (and is well remembered for lacking edge finishing trim around the recesses), and a fully automatic choke appeared – eliminating the manual choke lever which had a tendency to break.

=== Further range expansion ===
1982 was also the year when SD1 buyers could finally opt for a four-cylinder engine since the two-litre BL O-Series engine of the Morris Ital was now fitted to the car, now called the Rover 2000 - marking the first time an engine from the Austin-Morris division of BL would appear in a Rover. The engine was particularly aimed at company car fleets where its size enabled it to beat a taxation threshold. This broadened the SD1 range and made it more affordable to potential buyers, giving British Leyland an all-round rival to the Ford Granada, which had always featured a four-cylinder version, although unlike the SD1 or earlier P6 had never been available with a V8 engine. The Rover 2000 was not particularly fast, with a continental magazine stating that the most one could say was that it was faster than diesel and turbodiesel cars in the same class.

Another four-cylinder engine became available in the 90 bhp (67 kW; 91 PS) Rover 2400 SD Turbo. This was the only diesel-engined SD1, utilising the HR492 motor from Italian VM Motori also used in the Range Rover Turbo D model, chosen for its petrol-like smoothness. BL had intended for a diesel version of the Rover V8 engine to be used in the SD1 (as well as other models) but the problematic development programme was cancelled in 1983 in favour of engines bought-in from outside manufacturers.

==== Vitesse ====
The flagship model was created when Rover introduced a 190 bhp (142 kW; 193 PS) fuel-injected version of its V8, with 220 lb⋅ft (298 N⋅m) of torque. Applying technologies pioneered in the US and Australian markets (where strict emissions regulations meant the inclusion of high compression carburetted engines was not feasible) the new derivative was originally only available in the Vitesse model, but from 1984 onwards it was also offered in the luxury Vanden Plas range, badged as the Vanden Plas EFi. The Vitesse received ventilated front brakes with four-pot calipers as well as a strengthened transmission (with the same gear ratios), a sizable black rear spoiler, and cross-spoke aluminium wheels.

To meet the demands of the luxury executive car market, where automatic transmission tended to be preferred, Rover first offered an auto as an option in the Vitesse, but later withdrew the option and lured those customers to the plush Vanden Plas EFi instead which had all the standard comforts of the Vitesse, such as electric mirrors, windows and locks, a trip computer, headlight washers, an adjustable steering column and a four-speaker stereo (something special at that time). Additionally, it added as standard leather seats (velour cloth was a no-cost option), an electrically operated sunroof (available on all models) and cruise control; the only option being air-conditioning.

The SD1 twin-plenum Vitesse was produced as a homologation special to aid the model's performance for the 1986 European Touring Car Championship season, and featured a new twin, side-entry throttle plenum fuel injection system. Although Rover quoted no power increase in their brochures, power output was actually increased to somewhere between 210 and 220 brake horse power as reported in the motoring press at the time. However, Rover didn't officially disclose the power increase as they couldn't afford to re-homologate the engine for their touring car racing programme. Production ended early during August 1986. Of a planned production run of 500 cars, somewhere between 200 and 250 are known to have been produced.

=== End of production ===
The SD1 continued until the launch of its successor, the Rover 800 Series, in July 1986, the third product of the British Leyland/Austin Rover venture with Honda, which had been in development since 1981 as "Project XX" and also formed the basis of the Honda Legend.

Despite production ending in 1986, stocks of new SD1s remained available well into 1987, with the latest civilian spec examples were registered under the "E" registration prefix, with some stockpiled police specifications being registered even later, the fastback version of the 800 arrived in 1988. The Rover V8 engine remained in volume production and continued to be used in Land Rover products until 2003.

== List of model names ==
The car was never marketed as the "SD1". The models produced (throughout the life of the range, not all at once) were usually named according to their engine size.

- Rover 2000
- Rover 2300
- Rover 2400 SD Turbo
- Rover 2600
- Rover 3500
- Rover 2000 S
- Rover 2300 S
- Rover 2400 SD Turbo S
- Rover 2600 S
- Rover 3500 S
- Rover V8-S
- Rover 2000 SE
- Rover 2300 SE
- Rover 2400 SD Turbo SE
- Rover 2600 SE
- Rover 3500 SE
- Rover Vitesse
- Rover 2000 Vanden Plas
- Rover 2300 Vanden Plas
- Rover 2400 SD Turbo Vanden Plas
- Rover 2600 Vanden Plas
- Rover 3500 Vanden Plas
- Rover 3500 Vanden Plas EFi

The initial June 1976 launch was for the 3500 only. A little over a year later the 2300 and 2600 were added; the V8-S was a short-lived model introduced later (remembered for its headlamp wipers, gold alloys and the option of bright metallic "Triton" green paint), and dropped before the first mild facelift, after which the range was 2300, 2300 S, 2600 S, 3500 SE and 3500 Vanden Plas. The 2000 appeared at the time of the major facelift, with 2400 SD-Turbo, 2600 SE, 2600 Vanden Plas, Vitesse and 3500 Vanden Plas EFi appearing at various times afterwards. At the very end of the life of the car the range was briefly reduced to 2300, 2600 Vanden Plas, and Vitesse (now with a flush chin spoiler, deleted front fog lights, 190 bhp (140 kW) and deleted side graphics)

== Foreign production: the Standard 2000 ==
After its replacement by the Rover 800 series in the UK in 1986, the SD1 emerged in India as the "Standard 2000". From 1985 to 1988, it was assembled at the now-defunct Standard factory in Madras (renamed Chennai in 1996). However, the Indian version of the SD1 – powered by an elderly 2.0 L engine with only 83 hp (62 kW), and with raised suspension – was a failure since the under-powered engine did not justify the high price. Standard ceased car manufacture soon after.

The factory was secured after production ceased with Rimmer Brothers acquiring the entire stock of unused parts for resale in the UK. This has meant that a number of parts which had not been available for some time could again be bought new.

== Motorsport ==
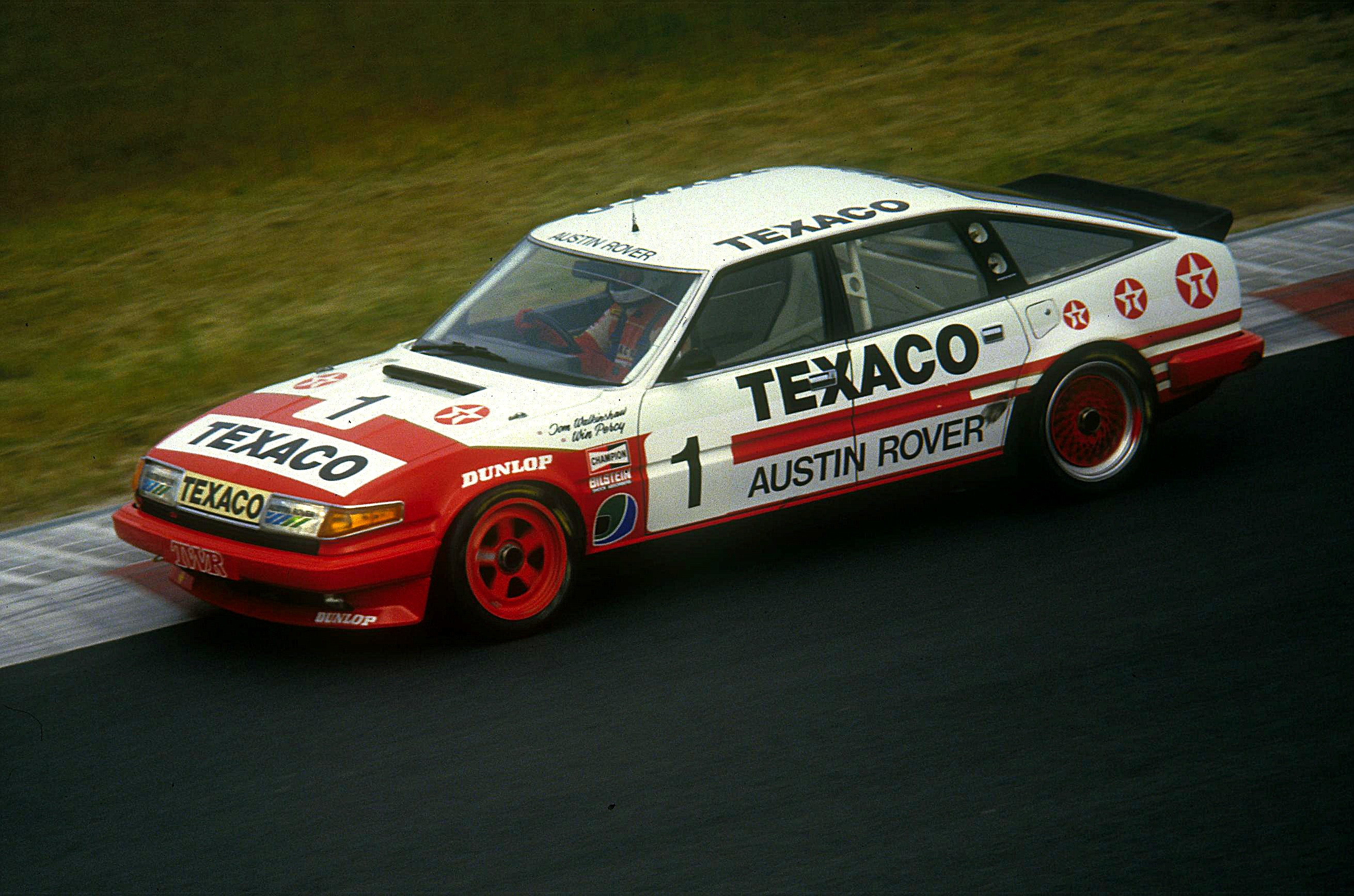
A modified Tom Walkinshaw Racing Rover SD1 Vitesse at the Nürburgring, 1985

The Rover SD1 saw considerable success in Group A touring car racing in the mid-1980s. Among its major successes were:

- Steve Soper and René Metge won the 1983 RAC Tourist Trophy driving a Rover Vitesse
- Andy Rouse won the 1984 British Saloon Car Championship driving a Rover Vitesse.
- Jeff Allam and Armin Hahne won the Group A class and finished 12th outright at the 1984 Bathurst 1000 in a Tom Walkinshaw Racing Rover Vitesse.
- Tom Walkinshaw and Win Percy won six rounds (Monza, Vallelunga, Donington, Silverstone, Nogaro and Jarama) of the 1985 European Touring Car Championship driving a TWR Rover Vitesse.
- TWR Rovers won five rounds (Monza, Donington, Anderstorp, Zeltweg and Silverstone) of the 1986 FIA Touring Car Championship.
- Kurt Thiim won the 1986 Deutsche Tourenwagen Meisterschaft driving a Rover Vitesse.

In touring car racing, the 3.5 L Rover V8 engine produced approximately 340 bhp (254 kW; 345 PS) by 1986.

The SD1 also saw use as a rally car in 1984 and 1985, contesting the British Rally Championship in the hands of Tony Pond. Pond won the Group A category of the 1985 championship, but the car was retired at the end of the season in favour of the Group B MG Metro 6R4.

== Police use ==
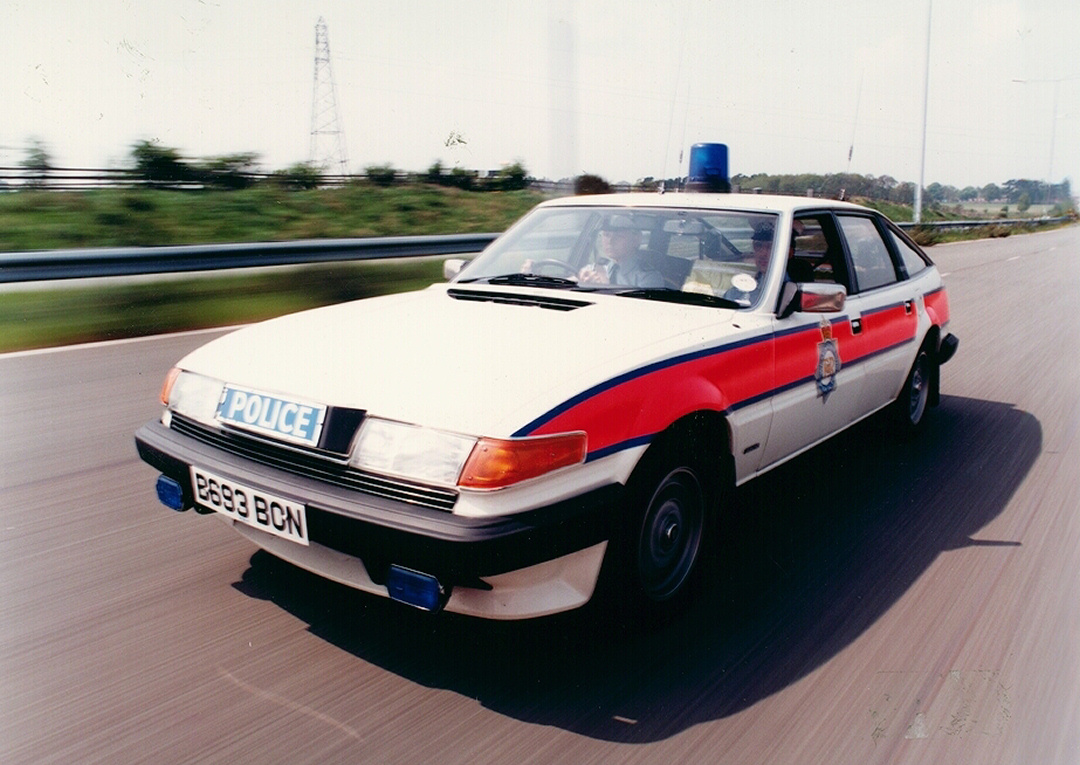
A West Midlands Police SD1 circa 1985

A Metropolitan Police SD1 in the force's 'jam sandwich' livery

Rover SD1s fitted with V8 engines were highly popular with many police forces in the United Kingdom, with forces across England, Scotland and Wales operating SD1s extensively throughout the 1970s and 1980s, primarily for use on traffic police duties on major roads and motorways. Police specification SD1s had the speedometer moved to the centre of the dashboard for visibility from both the driver and passenger seats, had painted trim on the front bumpers replaced with matt black, and received uprated four-piston front brakes and an automatic transmission. As was the case with civilian SD1s, police specification SD1s tended to suffer from build quality issues, with some forces opting to retire their fleet of SD1s early and purchasing Ford Granadas and Vauxhall Senators to replace them. Near the end of the SD1's production, some unsold Vanden Plas 2300 and 2600 SD1s were painted white and fitted out to police specification.

West Midlands Police, whose area of operations covered Rover's Castle Bromwich, Longbridge and Solihull factories, was the first police force in the United Kingdom to operate an SD1 in service, with a demonstrator Series 1 example being loaned to the force in 1976 for service on the M5 and M6 motorways. The Metropolitan Police, meanwhile, were a major operator of police specification SD1s, with the force's first SD1s to enter service in 1978 introducing their 'jam sandwich' livery. On 8 May 1987, a pair of Metropolitan Police SD1s made an emergency 27-mile drive through heavy central London traffic from Junction 7 of the M11 motorway to deliver a liver for transplant at the Cromwell Hospital in South Kensington within 34 minutes, with onboard video recorded from the backup SD1 later broadcast on Police Stop! and Police Camera Action! as 'The Liver Run'. Grampian Police were unique in taking delivery a single SD1 Vitesse model equipped with a manual transmission in 1984, intended for stopping speeding high-performance vehicles on the Stonehaven Bypass that had been bought by oil industry businesspeople in nearby Aberdeen; this SD1 has since been restored and donated to the Grampian Transport Museum.

Other operators of Series 1 SD1s included police forces in Avon and Somerset, Central Scotland, Cheshire, Dumfries and Galloway, Hertfordshire, Kent, Lothian and Borders, the Thames Valley, Warwickshire and West Yorkshire. Operators of the Series 2 SD1, meanwhile, included police forces in Avon & Somerset, Central Scotland, Dumfries and Galloway, Fife, Kent, Lancashire, South Wales, South Yorkshire, Sussex, the Thames Valley and West Yorkshire.
