= Triumph TR7 =

Triumph sports car

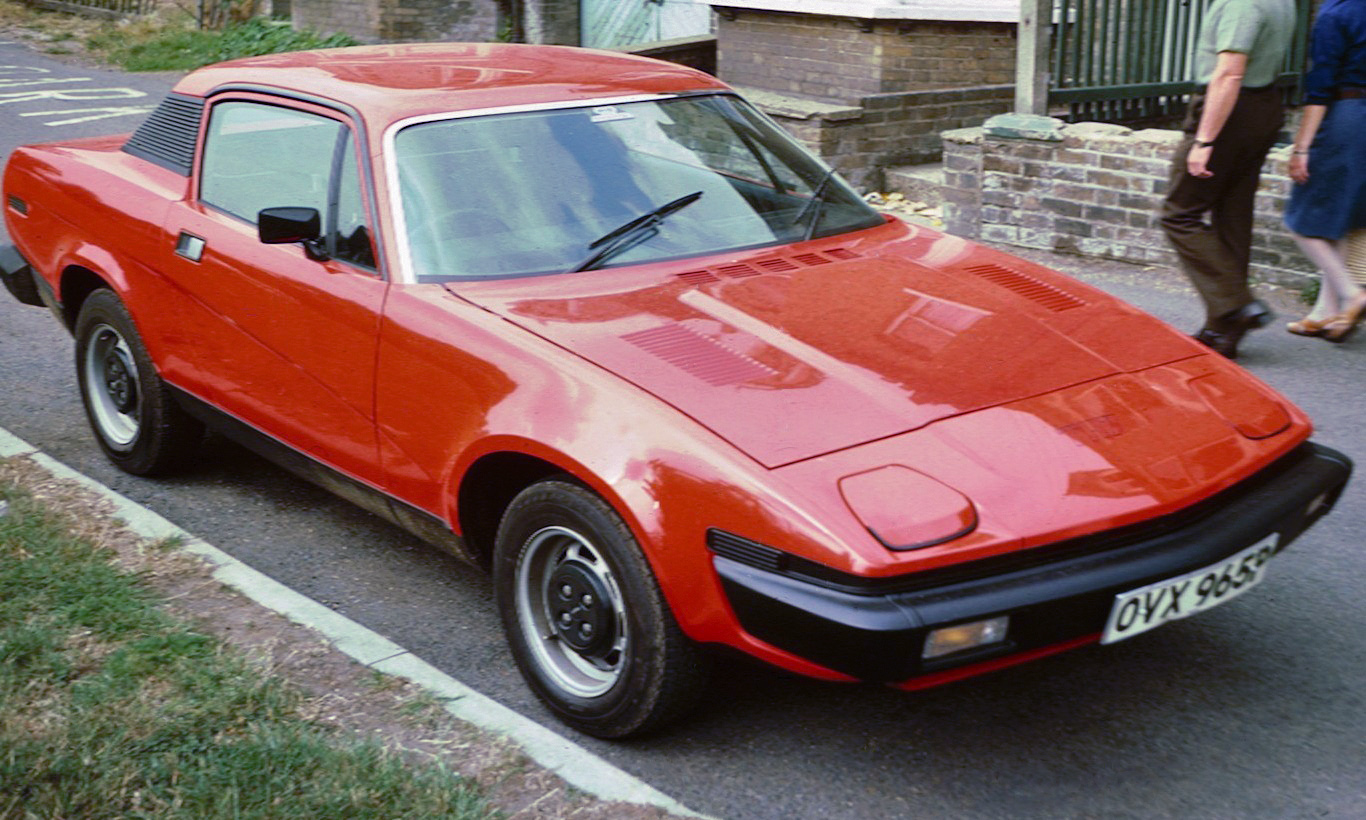
- 1975 Triumph TR7

Overview
- Manufacturer: Triumph (British Leyland)
- Production: September 1974 – October 1981; 112,368 (TR7 coupé/hardtop); 28,864 (TR7 cabriolet/roadster); 2,497 (TR8)
- Assembly: United Kingdom: Speke, Liverpool (1974–1978); Canley, Coventry (1978–1980); Solihull (Solihull plant: 1980–1981)
- Designer: Harris Mann

Body and chassis
- Class: Sports car
- Body style: 2-door roadster; 2-door coupé
- Layout: FR layout
- Related: Triumph TR8

Powertrain
- Engine: 1,998 cc (2.0 L) I4
- Transmission: 4-speed manual; 5-speed manual; 3-speed automatic

Dimensions
- Wheelbase: 85 in (2,159.0 mm)
- Length: 160 in (4,064.0 mm)
- Width: 66.2 in (1,681.5 mm)
- Height: 50 in (1,270.0 mm) (coupé)
- Kerb weight: 2,427 lb (1,101 kg) (coupé)

Chronology
- Predecessor: Triumph TR6

The Triumph TR7 is a sports car that was manufactured in the United Kingdom from September 1974 to October 1981 by British Leyland Motor Corporation (BLMC), which changed its name to British Leyland (BL) in 1975. The car was launched in the United States in January 1975, with its UK home market debut in May 1976. The UK launch was delayed at least twice because of high demand for the vehicle in the US, with final sales of new TR7s continuing into 1982.

It was initially produced at the Speke, Liverpool, factory, moving to Canley, Coventry, in 1978 and then finally to the Rover Solihull plant in 1980.

== Design and features ==
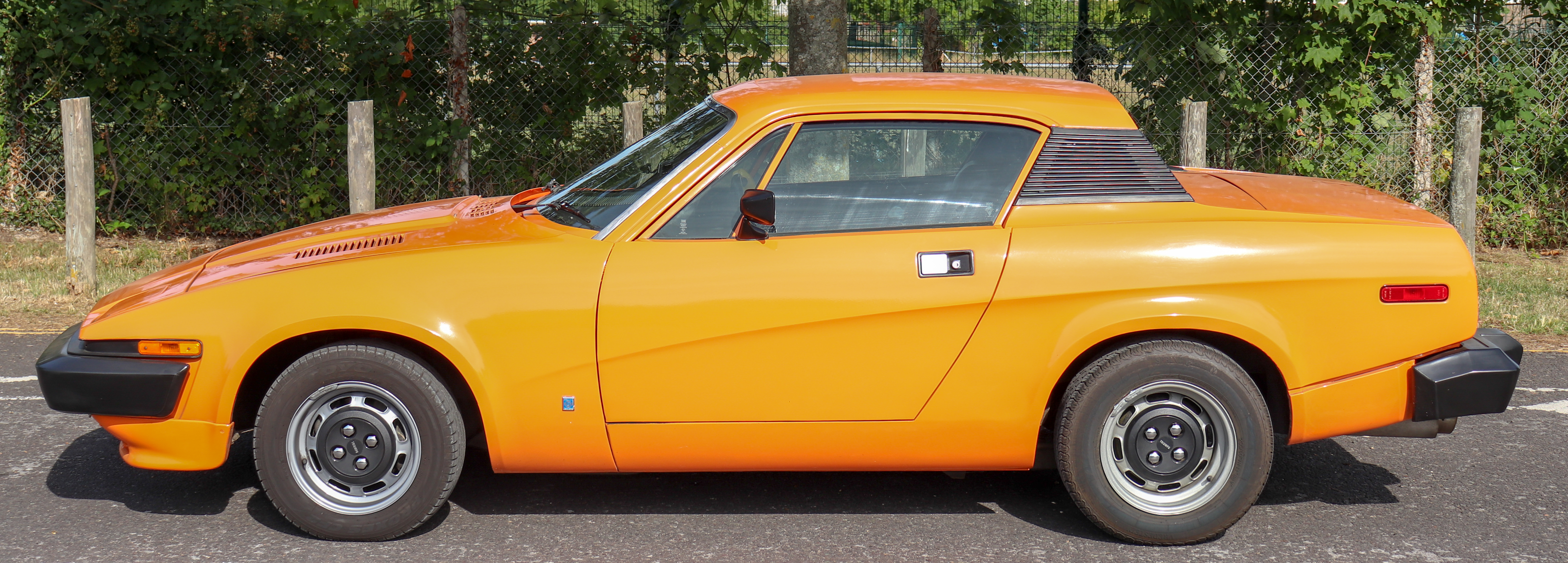
Side view of 1975 TR7 (not in an original colour/scheme, with aftermarket lower front spoiler, and converted to V8)

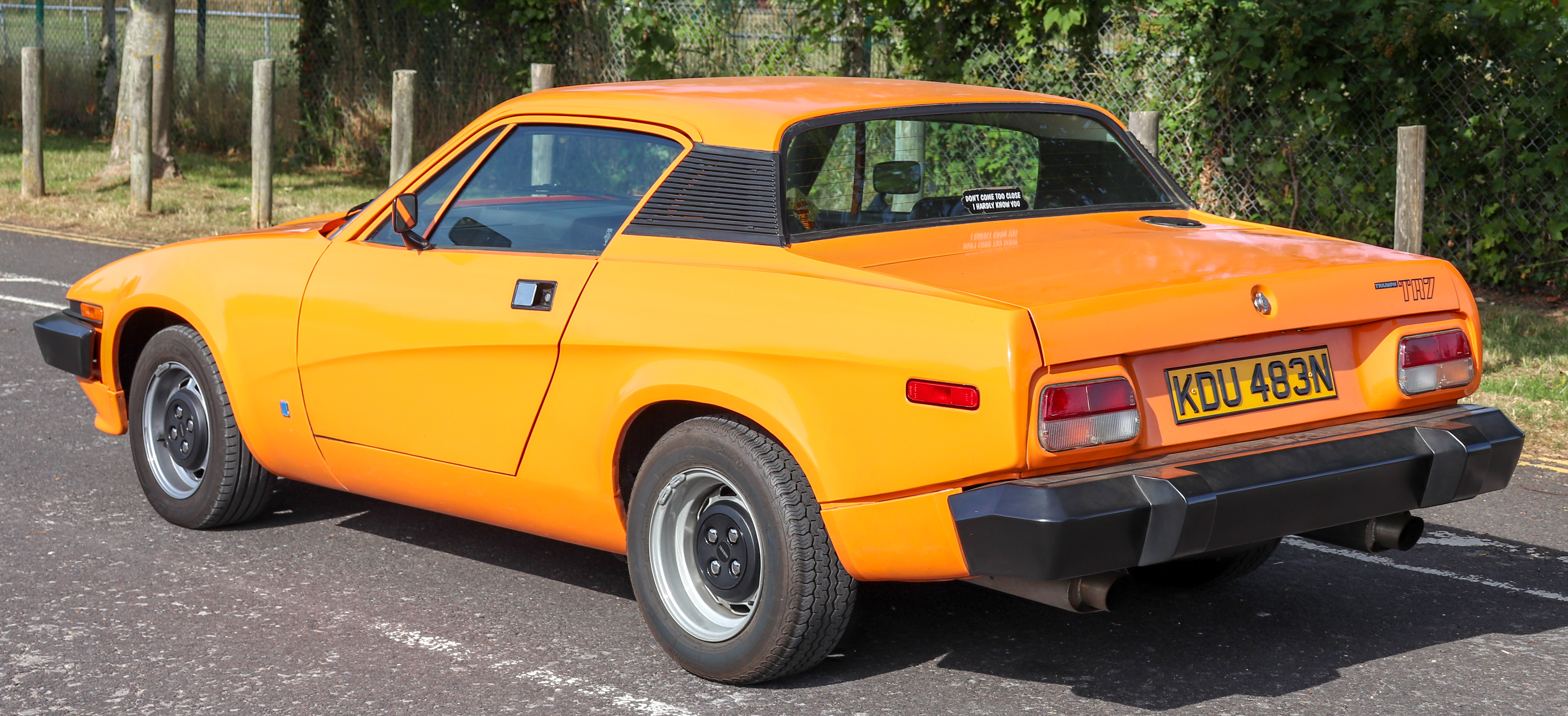
Rear view of 1975 TR7

The car, characterised by its "wedge" shape and by a swage line sweeping down from the rear to just behind the front wheel, was commonly advertised as "the shape of things to come". The design was penned by Harris Mann who also designed the wedge-shaped Princess. The car has an overall length of 160 in (410 cm), width of 66 in (170 cm), wheelbase of 85 in (220 cm) and height of 49.5 in (126 cm). The coupé has a kerbside weight of 2,205 lb (1,000 kg). During development, the TR7 was referred to by the code name "Bullet". MG branding was considered for the upmarket versions compared to the TR badged entry level versions, with "MG Magna" being used on some of the early clay models, but this did not reach production.

The TR7 was the first of Triumph's 'TR' line to not be offered as a convertible in its initial form, instead using a 2-door coupé configuration. With the United States showing increased concern for automotive safety in the 1970s, legislation was being considered to ban open roof convertibles due to rollover risks. As the US statistically represented the most lucrative market for Triumph sports cars, BL decided to avoid these potential risks by offering the TR7 only as a fixed roof coupé. The legislation to ban convertibles was not implemented and in 1979, Triumph introduced a convertible version of the TR7.

Power is provided by a 1,998 cc eight-valve four-cylinder engine that shares the same basic design as the Triumph Dolomite 1850 engine, albeit increased to 2 litres and fitted with larger carburettors, mounted in-line at the front of the car. Power is 105 bhp (78 kW) at 5,500 rpm, maximum torque is 119 lb⋅ft (161 N⋅m) at 3,500 rpm, the North American version produces 92 bhp (69 kW). Australian buyers received the same version in order to meet local emissions regulations. The European version was tested as having a 0–60 mph (97 km/h) time of around 10 seconds, with a top speed of 108.5 mph (175 km/h). Drive is to the rear wheels via a four-speed gearbox initially, with an optional five-speed manual gearbox and a three-speed automatic available from 1976. The front independent suspension uses coil spring and damper struts and lower single link at the front, and at the rear is a four-link system, again with coil springs. There are front and rear anti-roll bars, with disc brakes at the front and drums at the rear.

=== Revisions ===
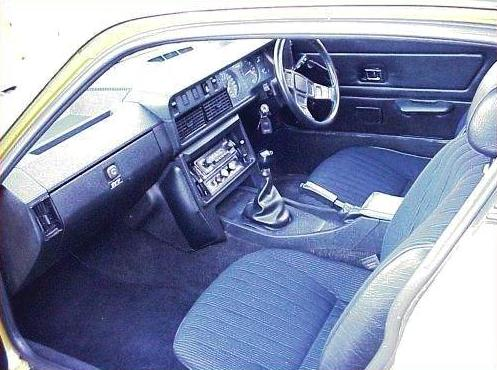
TR7 broadcord interior. (Lack of lights in driver's door)

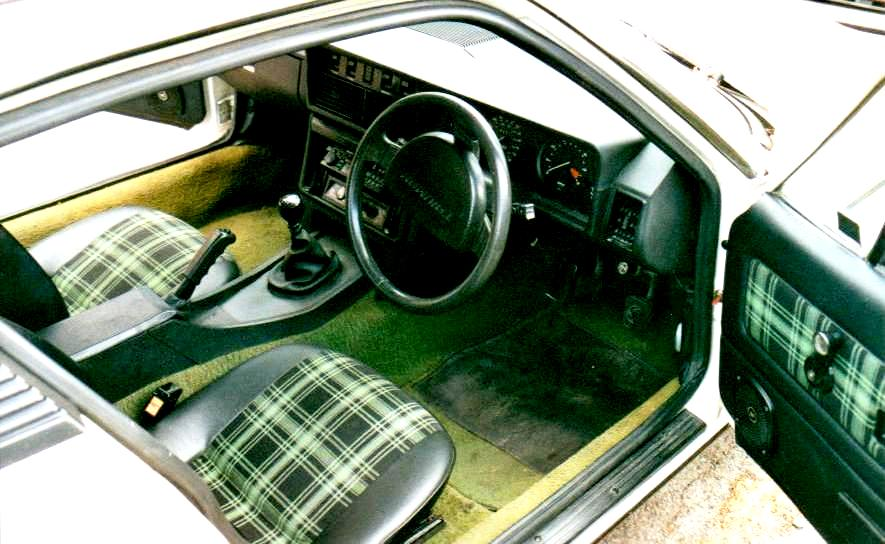
Green tartan interior (with US spec. steering wheel center)

The interior trim was revised in March 1977, with the broadcord seat covers being replaced with red or green "tartan" check inserts with black leather effect vinyl edging. The tartan trim is also reflected in the door cards in padded matching red or green tartan cloth inserts in the black leather effect vinyl.

The development of the convertible version of the TR7 required the interior light, which was in the headlining, to be removed. This was replaced by lights with integral switches in each of the door cards. A map light, mounted between the seats on the back panel below the rear parcel shelf, was deleted. The convertible also required a smaller fuel filler cap, as the deck area in front of the boot lid was reduced to allow for the stowage of the hood. These modifications were also applied to the hard top for the 1978 year model (starting after the factory's summer shutdown in 1977), presumably to maintain commonality of parts on the assembly line. The wheel trims were also changed at this time, from smaller black trims that covered only the centre of the wheels, to larger silver ones, covering the whole wheel.

External decor changes included simplification of the TR7 badge on the boot, the rear panel changing from black to body-colour, and the TR7 nose badge being replaced by a large laurel-wreath emblem with the Triumph name across its centre, this latter replaced on final production models by a small circular raised badge. Only a small number of 1978 year model cars, with the smaller filler cap and lights in the door cards, were produced at Speke, due to the industrial action there in 1977–78.

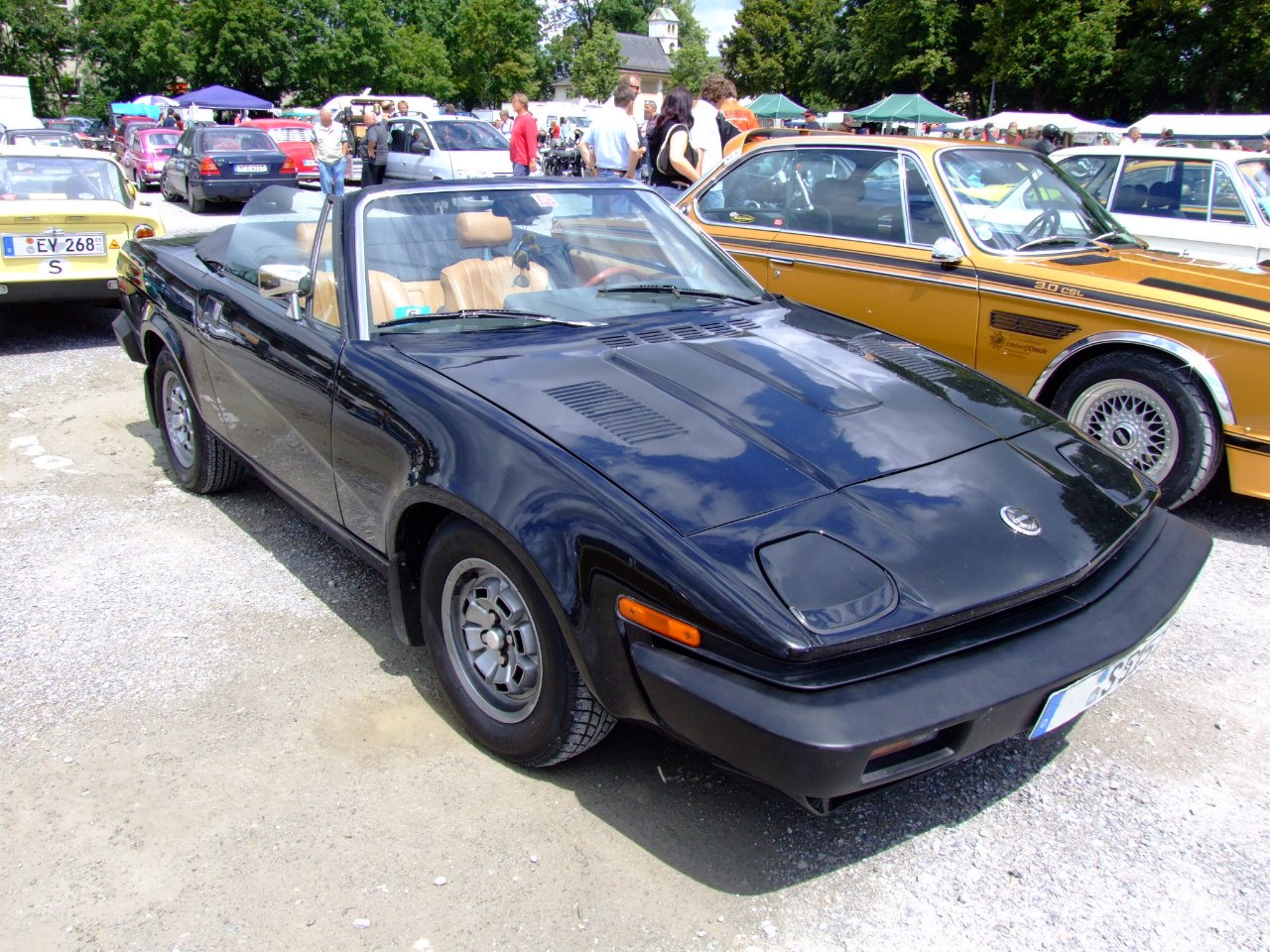
Solihull-built TR7 drop head coupe with double bulge bonnet

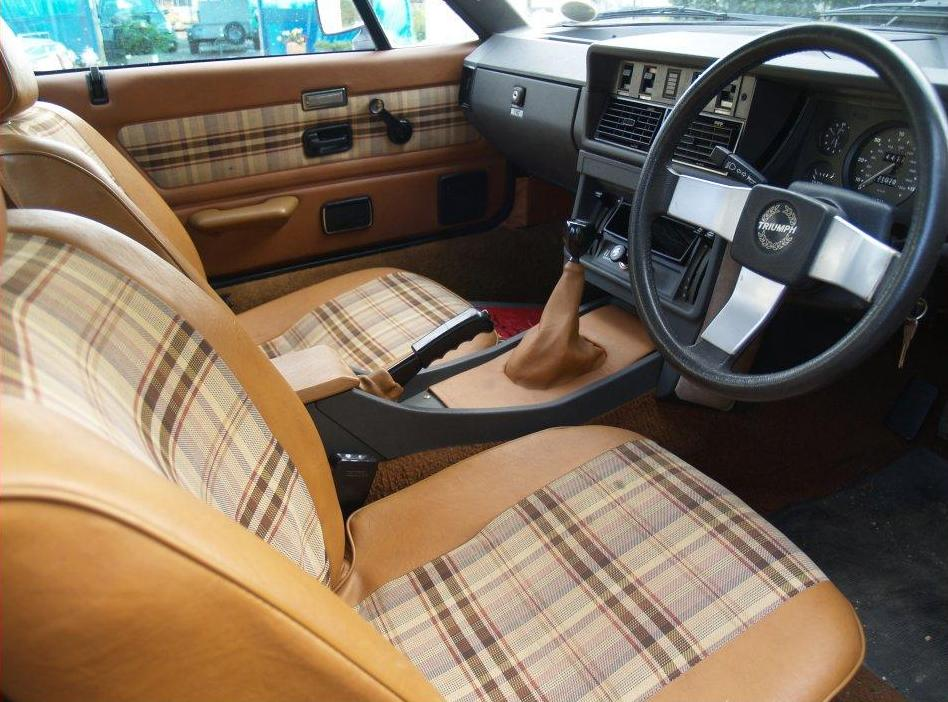
Tan plaid interior of a Triumph TR7. Note later rectangular door lock button at top left.

The development of a V8-engined version, which became the Triumph TR8, required an addition bulge in the bonnet, to clear the carburettors. This produced the "double bulge" or "double bump" bonnet, characteristic of TR7s and TR8s built at Canley and Solihull. However, at least some of the TR7s built at Canley have single bump bonnets; though it is possible these were cars that had not been completed at Speke, possibly due to the industrial action there, and finished off at Canley after production was moved.

During production at Canley, the seat trim was again revised, with a plaid cloth in navy blue or tan, with matching coloured leather effect edging, and matching door cards. A further trim change during production at Solihull saw the use of a ruched velour in blue or tan on the seats, with matching inserts on the doors. Also, the internal door lock buttons were changed from the earlier standard BL round ones, to rectangular buttons held on with small grub screws. There was also a change to the trip mile counter's reset button, which became a push type operated through the instrument "glass", rather than a turn type under the dash.

== Variants and derivatives ==
=== TR7 drophead coupé ===
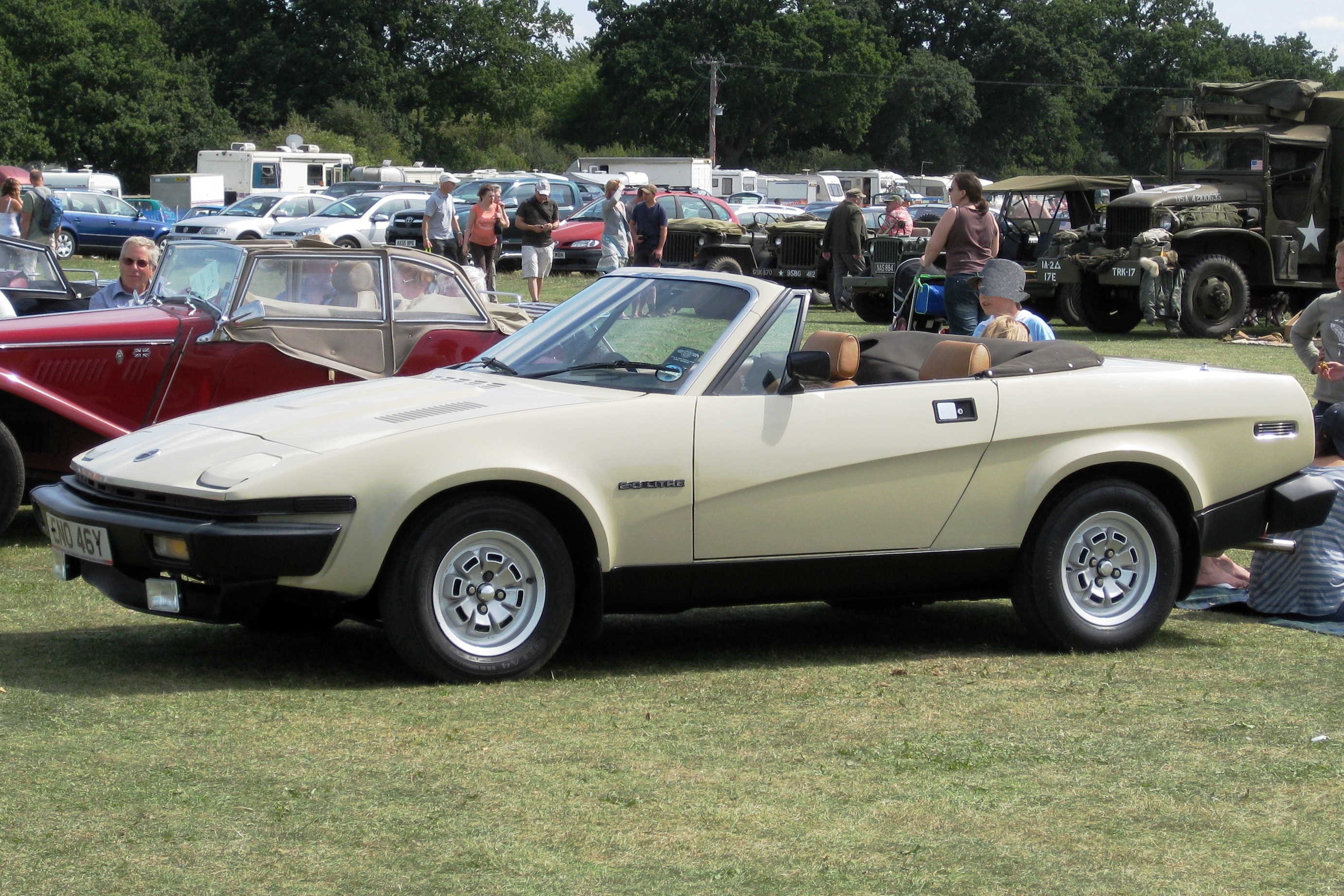
Triumph TR7 cabriolet 1,998cc

Because of proposed US legislation on roll-over protection at the time of its launch, the TR7 was not initially available as a convertible. In early 1979, Triumph belatedly introduced a convertible version, called the "TR7 drophead coupé" (DHC), which first went on sale in the US (the original hardtop model being known as the "fixedhead coupé", or FHC). A small number of pre-production cars were manufactured at Speke in 1978, soon after the pre-production TR7 V8 (later designated TR8) and TR7 Sprint cars. The British market received it in early 1980. The prototype for the convertible version of the original Harris Mann design came from Michelotti and the engineering to make it work was done by Triumph.

=== TR8 ===
For export to the US market, Triumph created a much more powerful Triumph TR8 model in 1977/78, which was a TR7 with a 135 bhp (101 kW) 3.5 L Rover V8 engine. While some genuine TR8 models stayed in Britain, these examples are exceedingly rare. Most TR8s went to the US, where they did not fare well, owing to Triumph's poor build quality at the time and the unusually strong pound, which peaked at around $2.40 by 1980, making Triumphs fairly expensive compared to competitors.

The TR8 was only launched as a convertible (DHC) model. However, about 400 hard-top (FHC) TR8s were produced at Speke and Canley, as these were needed (possibly with some TR7s converted by BL to TR8 specification) for the Group 4 homologation of the TR7V8 rally car.

=== Spider ===
In 1980, a limited-edition version of the TR7 Drophead was launched for the US market by the US importer. Called the "TR7 Spider", it was available only in "maraschino black", with reflective red striping and badging plus black interior trim. Alloy wheels and the steering wheel from the TR8 were fitted, along with a "pewter grey" carpet and grey striped upholstery. Based on an exhaustive inventory of the factory build cards at the British Heritage Motor Centre archives, it has been confirmed that 1,070 carburetted Spiders were built at the Solihull factory with an additional 548 fuel-injected (Bosch L-jetronic) Spiders built specifically for California. VIN numbers for Spiders run from 400301 to 401918 overall and for the fuel-injected version from 401374 to 401918. All the Spider-specific equipment was installed at the factory, with the exception of the radio-cassette, which was stored in the boot and installed at the port of entry.

=== Grinnall ===
Slightly less than a decade after the original TR7 ceased production, another British manufacturer, Grinnall Specialist Cars modified existing TR7 and TR8 cars. TR7 cars were upgraded with TR8 subframes and dash. They then installed V8 engines (optionally bored to larger capacities), and other parts like suspension, gearbox and brakes from the Rover SD1. The front and rear wings were widened to match the SD1 axles and suspension. 350 convertible cars were produced, each with Grinnall badging.

=== Cancelled variants ===
==== TR7 Sprint ====
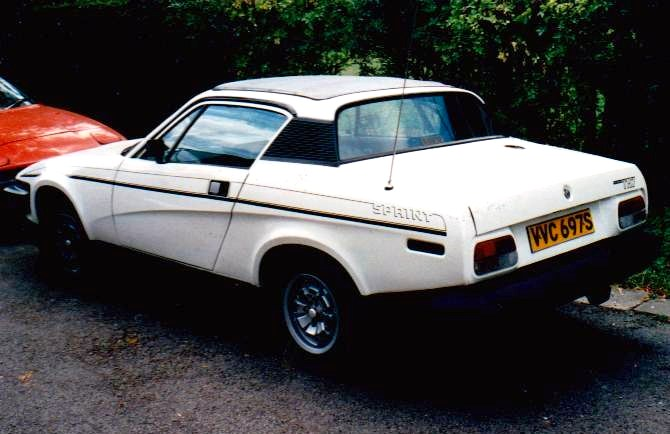
TR7 Sprint from rear, showing side stripe intended for the production version

A variant of the TR7 powered by the Dolomite Sprint engine (dubbed the "TR7 Sprint") was developed, but never put into full production; though British Leyland had the 16-valve engined TR7 homologated for use in competition. These cars can be identified by a different chassis number to the production eight-valve model: prefixed ACH rather than ACG, etc. The original engines are also numbered with the format CHnnnHE, rather than the VAnnnnHE format of Dolomite 16-valve engines. Production records at the British Motor Industry Heritage Trust (BMIHT) cover 58 prototype and pre-production cars, all fixedheads, built between February and October 1977. Another car, without production records, is identified by DVLA details, and the possible existence of two more has been inferred from the commissioning number sequence; making a possible maximum of 59 to 61 cars, of which several still exist in the UK and elsewhere. These cars were built at the BL plant at Speke, at the same time as the pre-production runs for the convertibles and TR7 V8s, including a run of about 30 cars built on the line during the factory changeover to the 1978 year model in June 1977. However, it is claimed that some cars at least were converted at Canley from completed TR7s built at Speke.

Production of the TR7 Sprint stopped with the closure of the Speke plant. However, the failure of the TR7 Sprint to go into full series production is also blamed on BL's sales and marketing department because they claimed its performance was not sufficiently different from the TR7, though its top speed and 0–60 mph (97 km/h) time were almost identical to those for the US specification carburetted version of the 3.5 litre 135 bhp (101 kW; 137 PS) Rover V8 powered Triumph TR8. Also, the Sprint engine was unsuitable for the emission-control equipment necessary for sale in the US, which was Sales and Marketing's main target market for the TR7 and TR8.

Even so, BL required some, probably about 50, 16-valve engined TR7s suitable for normal sale before the end of 1977. This was for the rehomologation of the 16-valve head to allow the 16-valve TR7 rally car to be used in the 1978 season following a change to the FIA's rules. That the TR7 Sprint was used in this is shown by a series of six photographs in the British Motor Museum's archives, taken on 1 November and listed as TR7 Sprint Homologation. The 16-valve head was approved for use with the Group-4 rally car a second time in February 1978 in time for the Mintex Rally.

Converting a two-valve TR7 to the four-valve Sprint specification is relatively simple, compared to conversion to TR8 specification, because the TR7 and TR7 Sprint have virtually identical engine blocks. As a result, there are a number of such converted TR7 models around: "There are a [comparatively] large number of privately built Sprint conversions about ... Buyers should beware of this if they are asked a premium price for an alleged 'genuine' TR7 Sprint."

==== Lynx ====
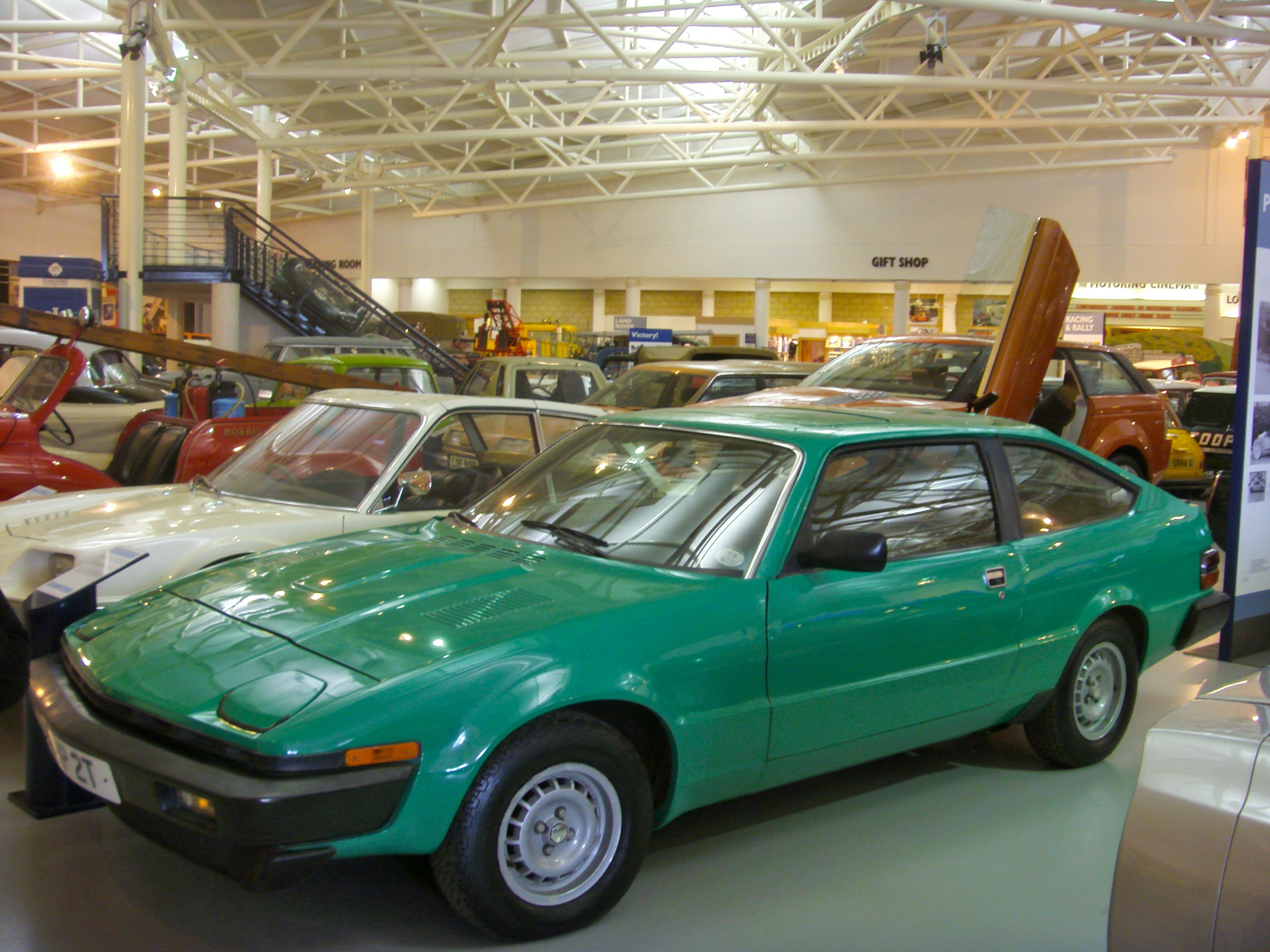
The last remaining Triumph Lynx prototype at the Heritage Motor Centre, Gaydon.

While the TR7 was under development in the early 1970s, a 2+2 fastback derivative, codenamed Lynx was also planned. Intended to be a replacement for the Triumph Stag, the Lynx had a wheelbase stretched by 12 inches (300 mm), the Rover V8 engine, with the rear axle from the Rover SD1. It was originally scheduled for launch in 1978, however, due to the closure of the Speke factory and concerns about low potential sales, the Lynx was cancelled. 18 prototypes were produced, with only one currently remaining.

==== Broadside ====
In early 1979, a joint MG-Triumph project to produce a new sportscar based on the TR7 was started under the name Project Broadside. This was based on the TR7, with a wheelbase stretched by 5 inches (130 mm), with either an O-Series or Rover V8 engine, and both drophead and fastback body styles. Project Broadside was cancelled later in 1979, owing to a lack of funding.

Examples of both Lynx and Broadside can be seen at the BMIHT, Gaydon, England.

==== Boxer ====
During the latter part of 1979, as an exercise in badge engineering, another MG version of the TR7 was developed under the codename Boxer as a potential replacement for the MGB. Various concepts were presented and ultimately a design from BL's American headquarters at Leonia was accepted. Major changes to the standard TR7 hardtop were the addition of a MG-type grille to the nose panel, headlights similar to those of a Porsche 928 and a new tail panel with light units from a Rover SD1. The proposal was ultimately rejected on the grounds that the car was insufficiently different from the TR7.

==== O-Series Engined TR7 ====
About 25 prototype/development TR7s fitted with the BL O-series engine were built. Build dates are not currently known, nor when the programme was cancelled. However, there are records showing these cars were either partly scrapped to rolling shells or converted to TR8 specifications, before being sold off in 1983.

At least one of these O-Series TR7s (KPH 537V) was fitted with an early (Canley developed) version of the O-Series turbo-charged engine. This was recorded as being the fastest ever Triumph on the test track at MIRA achieving an average lap speed of 129.16 mph (207.86 km/h) and a flying 1/4 mile (400 m) speed of 132.35 mph (213.00 km/h) - both figures being almost 2 mph (3 km/h) faster than the fastest recorded TR8 (KPH 574V) at MIRA.

== Motorsports ==
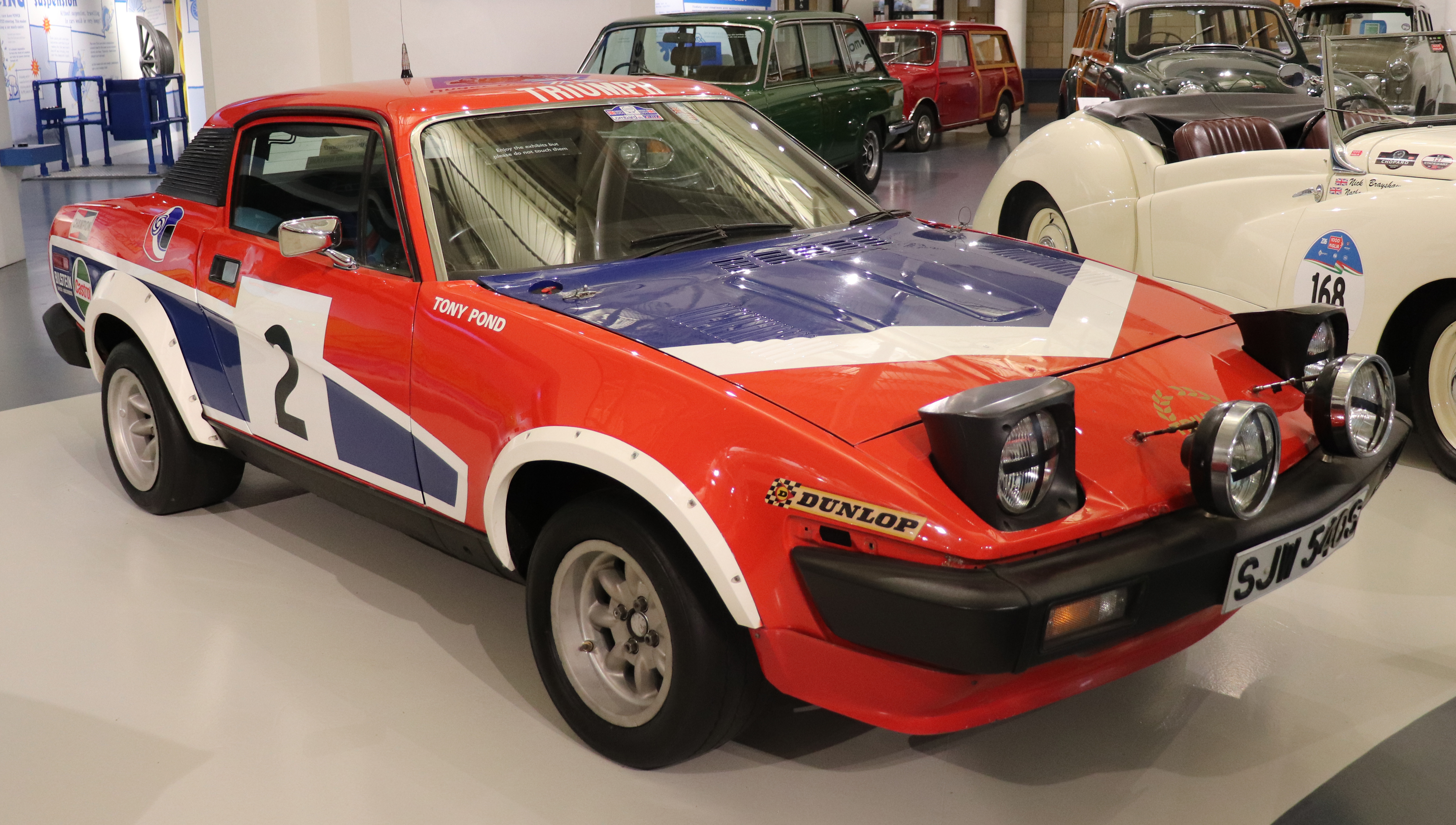

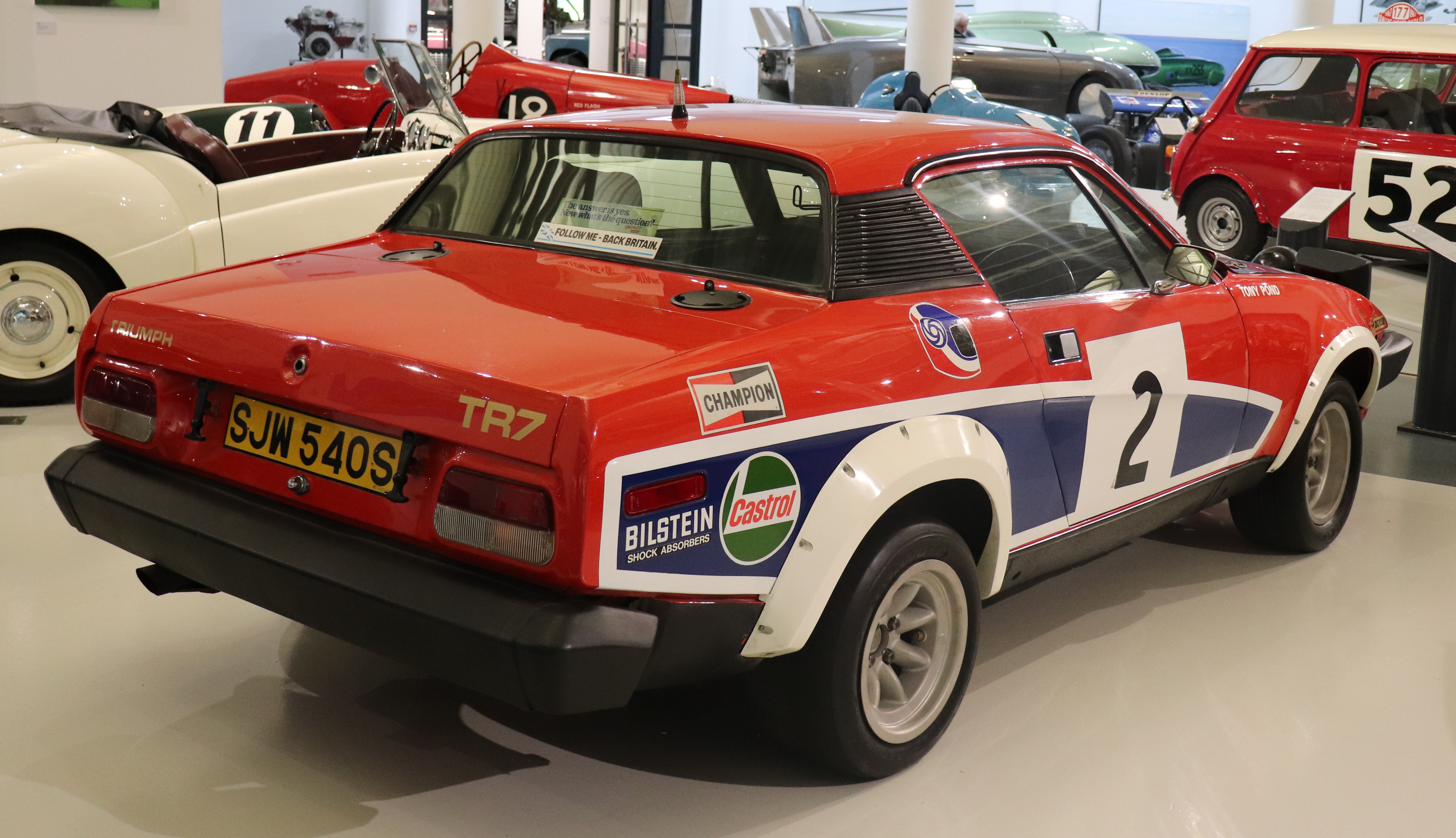
A V8-equipped TR7 rally car at the British Motoring Heritage Museum

British Leyland ran a team of TR7s in rally competitions from 1976 to 1980. These cars initially used the 16-valve Dolomite Sprint engine and later switched to the Rover V8 engine (before the introduction of the TR8, so dubbed "TR7 V8"). They were reasonably successful on tarmac events but were less successful on gravel sections. The most successful driver of these cars was Tony Pond.

John Buffum won the SCCA PRO Rally Championship from 1977 to 1980 driving TR7 and TR7 V8 cars.

The TR7-V8 models continue to be successful in classic rallying events.

The 16-valve engined TR7 rally car was homologated for group 4 in October 1975, well before any 16-valve TR7 Sprints are known to have been produced. This was possible at the time using the "100-off rule", as John Davenport called it, in the FIA's appendix J to the International Sporting Code 1975. This 100-off rule described a list of "Optional equipment which may be recognized with a minimum production of 100 units per year to equip 100 cars" and requirements for their use. However, it did not require that any cars actually be so equipped, just that 100 of the "bolt-on option kits" be produced, listed, and made available for sale. As well as alternative cylinder heads with different numbers of cams and valves, this list of optional equipment also included many other engine, suspension, and transmission components, and so covered the use of the 4-speed, close-ratio gearbox and overdrive from the Triumph Dolomite Sprint (the heavy duty axle from the 5-speed TR7 was initially homologated for group 3 by another, less clear, route, though re-homologated later, presumably on production of 5-speed TR7s). Further modifications, including the larger front brakes and rear disk brakes, were covered as "Optional equipment which may be recognized without a minimum production". In 1975, Appendix J listed yet more modifications allowed, with restrictions, to cars for group 4, including pistons, manifolds, carburettors, and suspension, etc., that could be fitted without the FIA needing to recognize or approve them.

However, the BL rally team had to regain approval for the 16-valve head for the 1978 season, and several others such as Lancia, Toyota, Vauxhall, and Ford had similar problems at that time. This was because the FIA deleted the 100-off rule from 1976, though mechanical parts and cars already using it were allowed to be used until the end of 1977. The number of cars suitable for "normal sale" required to gain approval of such a modification under the 1976 rules does not appear to be recorded. However, several other similar modifications of the era, including the Vauxhall Chevette HSR, Porsche 924 Carrera GTS, and possibly Ford RS rally cars, involved production of batches of 50 cars. This may explain, at least in part, the production of the 60 or so 16-valve TR7 Sprints in 1977. Their use in this homologation process is shown by 6 photographs of a TR7 Sprint (later registered SJW 530S) described in the British Motor Museum Film and Picture Library archives as "TR7 Sprint Homologation".

The V8 version was homologated on 1 April 1978. This was homologated as a separate model, the TR8, directly into group 4, but because the TR8 had not yet been launched "as a compromise to keep the BL marketing people happy, it was called the TR7V8 instead." At that time, appendix J required 400 cars suitable for "normal sale". However, the number produced by April 1978 is believed to have been less than 150. Journalist and historian Graham Robson quotes John Davenport as saying "In those days there was no rigorous FIA inspection system. Provided that one provided a production sheet signed by an important manager, then nobody worried". Robson goes on, "A lot of fast and persuasive talking then went on, to show that the makings of well over 500 [sic.] cars were either built, partly built, or stuck in the morass of the Speke strike—the result being that homologation was gained." However, the FIA rules are specific that these should be "entirely finished cars, e.g., cars in running condition and ready for delivery to the purchasers." Also, the Ford Escort Mk2 RS1800 was re-homologated into Group 4, as the 2 L Escort RS, with only about 50 produced in 1977 and only about 109 in total - though has been claimed the FIA had included Escorts modified to RS1800 specification by others, after sale, despite this clearly being outside the FIA's rules.

== Quality problems ==
Quality problems tended to undermine the car's image in the marketplace. This was primarily the result of the poor relations between management and workforce and frequent strikes at the Speke factory near Liverpool. Quality improved when production was moved to the Canley plant in Coventry, and later Solihull. However, it was too late to save the car's reputation.

In its Frankfurt Motor Show preview edition of September 1977, the German magazine Auto, Motor und Sport reported that the engine of a TR7 press car had given up the ghost and "started to boil" while undergoing a maximum speed measurement exercise over a 4 km (2.5 miles) stretch of track as part of a road test. At the time of the report, the cause of the problem was still unknown; British Leyland technicians had already been investigating the car, without comment, for nineteen days.

== Production volumes ==
In total approximately 115,000 TR7 models were built which includes 28,864 soft top/convertibles, and approximately 2,800 TR8 models.

By the late 1970s, sports cars were becoming a low volume niche product that British Leyland could ill-afford to support, given its volume car business was already struggling. A rationalisation plan introduced by incoming BL chairman Michael Edwardes saw the TR7 put on life support by axing the MG MGB as it was felt that the latter was cannibalizing the TR7's sales - however this controversial decision failed to revive the TR7's fortunes when it too was axed in 1981, with the end of car production at Solihull, which was to become exclusively a Land Rover plant.

The demise of the TR7 (and the Dolomite a year earlier) marked the end of the lineage of Triumph sports cars, with the marque continuing on the Triumph Acclaim until 1984. However, the Acclaim was a licence-built Honda Ballade, built at the Cowley assembly plant and was pitched as a family saloon rather than as a sports car.
