= Triumph TR8 =

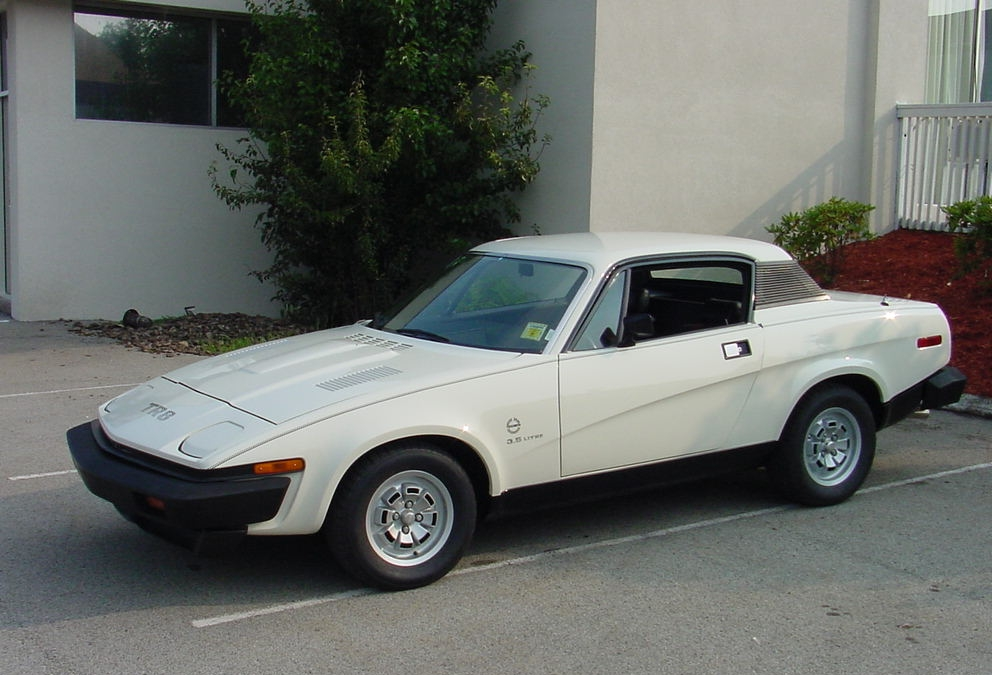

Overview
- Manufacturer: Triumph (British Leyland)
- Production: 1978–1981
- Assembly: United Kingdom: Speke, Liverpool; Coventry; Solihull
- Designer: Harris Mann

Body and chassis
- Class: Sports car
- Body style: 2-door roadster; 2-door coupé
- Layout: FR layout
- Related: Triumph TR7

Powertrain
- Engine: 3,528 cc (3.5 L) Rover V8
- Transmission: 5-speed manual

Dimensions
- Wheelbase: 2,160 mm (85.0 in)
- Length: 4,067 mm (160.1 in)
- Width: 1,681 mm (66.2 in)
- Height: 1,267 mm (49.9 in)
- Curb weight: 1,203.9 kg (2,654 lb)

Chronology
- Predecessor: Triumph TR7

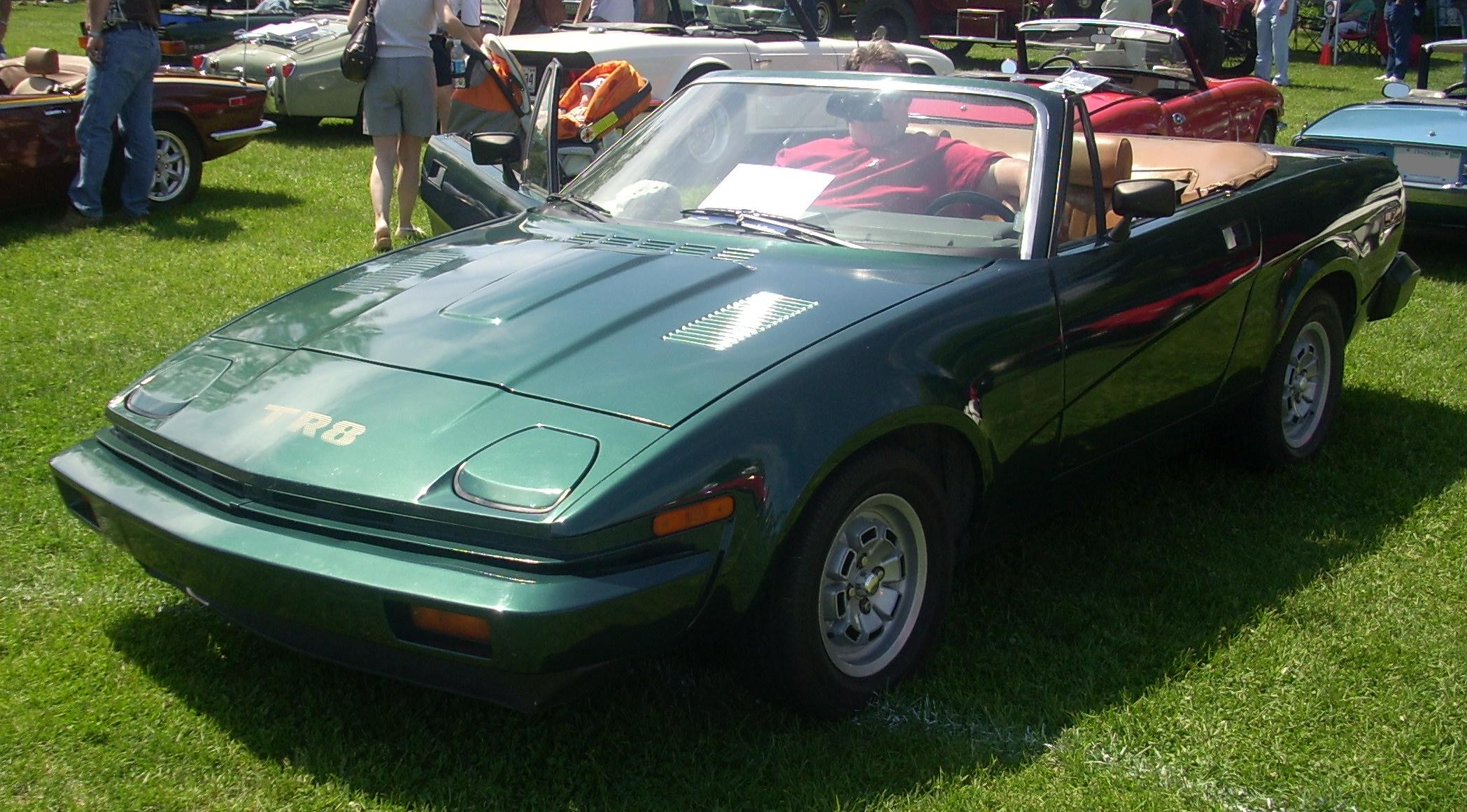
Triumph TR8

The Triumph TR8 is a sports car built by the British Triumph Motor Company from 1978 until 1981. It is an eight-cylinder version of the "wedge-shaped" Triumph TR7 which was designed by Harris Mann and manufactured by British Leyland (BL), through its Jaguar/Rover/Triumph (JRT) division. The majority of TR8s were sold in the United States and Canada.

== Background ==
A more powerful V8-engined version of the TR7 was planned in the early stages of the TR7's development, a prototype being produced in 1972. However, British Leyland's financial state, labour problems and lack of engines—as MG and Range Rover had first priority—delayed the project. By 1978 some 145 prototype cars were built with V8 engines (and usually automatic transmissions). These "anonymous" TR8s (no identifying badges, and all coupes) were evaluated for British Leyland by various dealers and then sold off as used cars.

The FIA papers for the TR8 homologation, granted 1 April 1978, include pictures showing a 1977 TR7 V8 prototype with a set of decals indicating it to be a TR7 V8. However, these TR8 homologation pictures also show it had the large "Sprint" decals on the rear wings, in the same font as the TR7 and V8 decals on the boot lid. It is not clear from the picture of the front of the car whether or not it had a small Sprint decal below the TR7 decal, as is shown on the TR8 prototype in Hardcastle’s book on the Rover V8 engine. Neither of these decals are part of the set used on the car shown in the TR7 Sprint homologation pictures in the BMIHT archives, and in Knowles’ Triumph TR7 The Untold Story. And, unlike that decal set, the Sprint decals shown on this TR8 and that in Hardcastle are not known by any BL part numbers. The official use of these pictures in the homologation process may suggest that BL toyed with the idea of calling this car the "TR7 V8 Sprint" or "TR7 Sprint V8", etc., at some point, but did not progress the idea beyond when these photographs were taken.

== Description ==
The TR8 did not use Triumph's own single overhead cam V8 as found in the Stag due to its weight and service record but instead shared its Rover V8 engine with the Rover SD1. The engine itself was derived from an early 1960s Buick/Oldsmobile all-aluminium V8 215 cu in (3.52 L) that Rover acquired from General Motors in the mid-60s.

History has shown this engine to be a reliable, flexible, and robust powerplant, especially after BL improved its manufacturing process. TR8s were initially fitted with twin Zenith-Stromberg carburetors. However, about 400 1980 models sold in California, all 1981 models—of which only 352 were produced including twenty carbed cars for the UK market---and all 1982 models (of which all seventy went to Canada) featured a Bosch L-jetronic fuel injection system with a specially designed Lucas fuel injection computer (ECU). The 1980 carburetor model was rated at 133 bhp (99 kW; 135 PS) (at 5000 rpm) and the fuel injected California version at 137 bhp (102 kW; 139 PS) at the same engine speed. For 1981, all North American cars received a unified version with fuel injection, producing 148 bhp (110 kW; 150 PS) at 5100 rpm and delivering 0–60 mph times in the low 8 seconds. Other differences between the TR8 and TR7 are upgraded brakes, revised axle ratio (3.08:1 on the TR8 and all automatic TR7s), battery moved to the trunk (boot), alloy wheels, leather steering wheel and a few minor trim changes.

== Production ==
TR8 coupes based on the original Harris Mann TR7 design made from 1978 to 1980 are quite rare; it is estimated that only about 400 TR8 coupes ever existed—this number from records kept by members of the North America-based wedge club, the Triumph Wedge Owners Association. To the roughly 150 pre-production coupes mentioned above, another 250 or so coupes were produced, some sold in Canada as 1979 models but most ended up being held back and then finally sold in the US as 1980 models. In 1979, a long-anticipated Michelotti-refreshed TR7 Drophead (convertible) was introduced, and almost all subsequent production TR8s were convertibles. Total worldwide production, as best as can be determined throughout all the labour turmoil at the time, is only around 2750, give or take a "handful". (Enthusiast Richard Connew went through the records at British Motor Heritage Industry Trust and counted 2746.) Other estimates exist. The German version of this page claims 2722 and cites the TR Register-Austria as source; 2815 is the number quoted in an article from Classic & Sports Car, March 1986 and in William Kimberley's 1981 book as well. The TR8 was due to be launched in the UK and a pilot production run was made consisting of four prototypes and 18 pre-production cars. However, at this point, British Leyland unexpectedly cancelled the project. The pre-production cars were subsequently sold via the dealer network to the general public and are highly collectable. Both the TR7 and TR8 were made until October 1981 when production ceased.

Very few genuine TR8s exist outside of the United States and Canada. In other countries the TR7 is often converted to a "TR7V8" with the same ubiquitous Buick/Rover 3.5 litre V8 powerplant used in original factory TR8s. In Australia a popular TR7V8 conversion is to use the 4416 cc version of this engine that had been developed for the Leyland P76.

In North America, the TR8 originally sold for around $11,000. A current rough estimate of the number of these cars remaining taken from the Triumph Wedge Owners Association registry of unique VINs, current Triumph Wedge Owners Association membership records, the World Wide TR7 TR8 Owners Club, and the TR Drivers Club UK is around 1000 convertibles and 200 coupes.

As of Q1 2011 there were approximately seventeen licensed and 33 SORN TR8s registered with the DVLA. The accuracy of this data is questionable as many converted TR7s with a V8 have been registered with DVLA as TR8s. Out of these fifty cars, only two are automatic, but more are known to exist.

== Motorsport ==
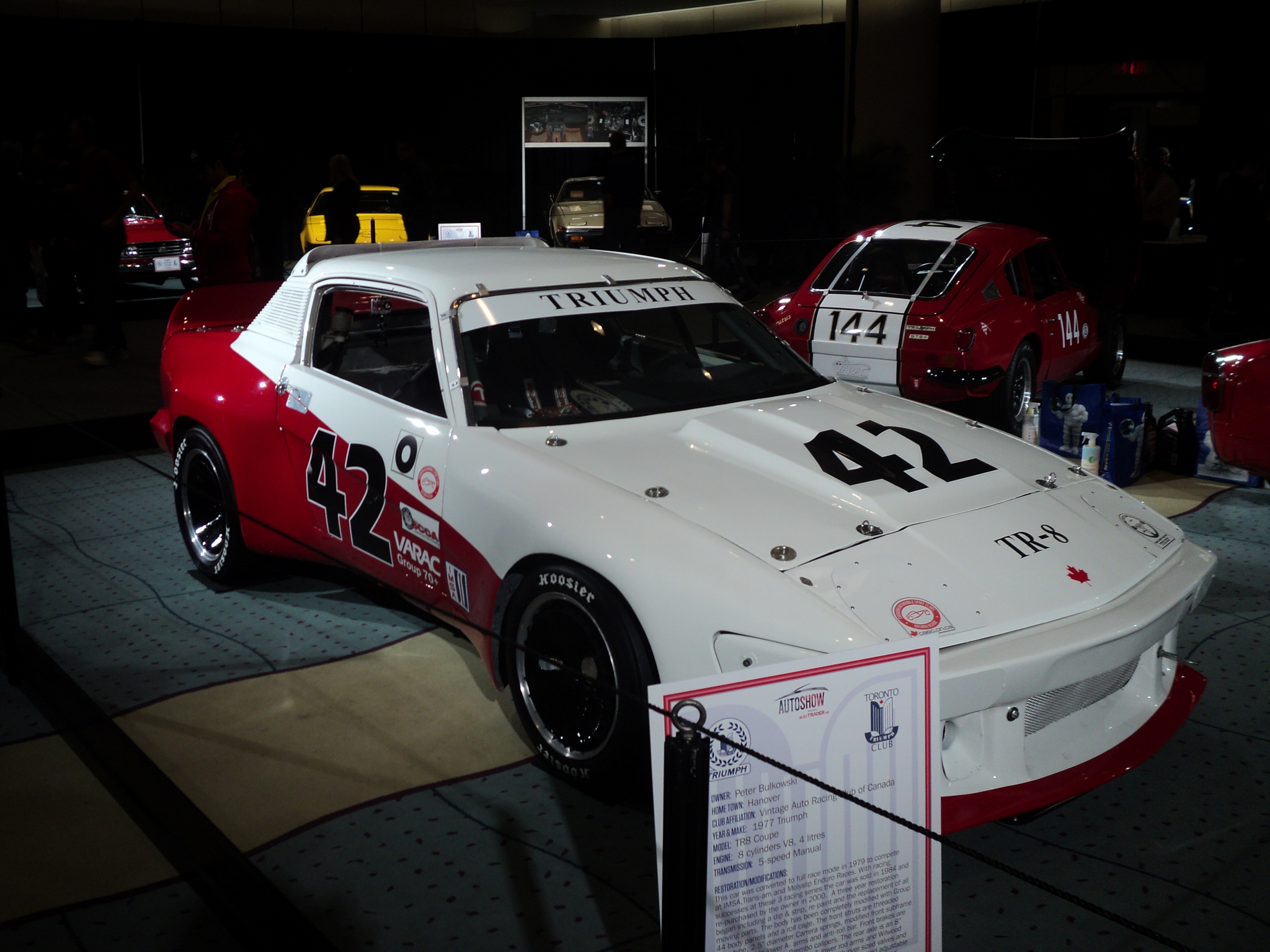
IMSA TR8 racer on display at the Canadian International Autoshow.

Despite their low production numbers, TR8s have an interesting racing history. John Buffum successfully raced one as a rally car in the late 1970s. Bob Tullius of Group 44 fame dominated SCCA racing in 1979 in one, so much so that the SCCA added enough "reward" weight to the car that Tullius left Trans Am and successfully competed in IMSA GT instead.

A Canadian TR8 carrying number 42 competed in endurance racing and the Trans-Am series. The car contested in the IMSA six-hour races in 1980, 1981 and 1982 at Mosport, placing 15th overall in 1982 with Peter Bulkowski and Bob Armstrong sharing the driving duties. Bulkowski also drove that car in Trans-Am events at Mosport in 1981 and Trois-Rivières in 1982. The car was built by Bruce Kulczyk with support from Group 44 with supplying body panels and mechanical parts.

TR8s ran successfully in the SCCA's showroom stock series being campaigned by Morey Doyle ( Nationals & Regionals) and Ted Schumacher (Nationals). Schumacher with Doyle had great success in the Playboy/Escort Endurance series with his car. Starting the last race of the year, Schumacher was fourth in the overall point standings (just three points away from first) when an accident ruined their chances; nevertheless, Schumacher still ended up seventh in the manufacturer's points for that year, all with no official factory help. Presently, at least three cars are being run in SCCA's ITS class. Morey Doyle and his son Andy run their TR8s in the Midwest Region, currently Morey and his sons, Morey C. and Andy are preparing the car for the SCCA National Runoffs in E-Prod at Indianapolis Motor Speedway (2017). Jeff Young runs his green TR8 in the Southeast Division with numerous regional race wins and the 2011 Southeast Division SARRC ITS championship, running against over seventy other drivers in Mazda RX7s, Miatas, 240/260/280Zs, BMW 325is, Porsche 944s and Acura Integras.

The TR8 was homologated for Group 4 (racing) on the first of April 1978. According to the FIA rules that applied at this time, recognition would have required the production of 400 similar cars suitable for normal sale. However, production records (in the BMIHT archives) show that only about 150 cars had actually been built by this time, mostly due to major industrial action at the BL Speke plant that included a 17-week-long strike from November 1977. Rally journalist and historian Graham Robson quotes John Davenport (director of BL Motorsport at the time) as reminding him that "In those days there was no rigorous FIA inspection system. Provided that one provided production sheets signed by an important manager, then nobody worried...." Robson goes on to state that "A lot of fast and persuasive talking then went on, to show that the makings of well over 500 [sic] cars were either built, partly built, or stuck in the morass of the Speke strike". However, the FIA rules are clear that only "entirely finished cars" might be counted towards this requirement.

An alternative explanation that does not ignore the FIA's explicit requirement for finished cars comes from an article on the Group-4 Vauxhall Chevette HS, published in Autosport only a few weeks after the TR8 was approved. That says "there had arisen an understanding that some leeway was allowed. For instance, if the 400 cars were built within a few months of the homologation date then the car would normally be allowed through." And while the homologation of the Chevette HS was approved on 1 Nov. 1976, the 400 Chevette HSs weren't finished till the end of 1977. Production records show that about another 250 fixed head coupe TR8s were built in 1978, making up the FIA requirement for 400. While the fixed head version of the TR8 does not appear to have ever been a catalogued model, only the convertible, and "[f]ollowing the cancellation of the project, normal practice might have been to dismantle the cars or convert them to normal TR7 power", most or all were sold to private buyers in the US or Canada. This may be as a result of the FIA requirement for such homologation specials to be "meant for the normal sale".

The TR8 did not go on sale in North America until mid-1979, and then only as a convertible model. According to Graham Robson, the Group 4 rally car was therefore called the TR7V8 as a compromise with BL Sales and Marketing.
