= Solihull plant =

Car assembly plant in Solihull, UK

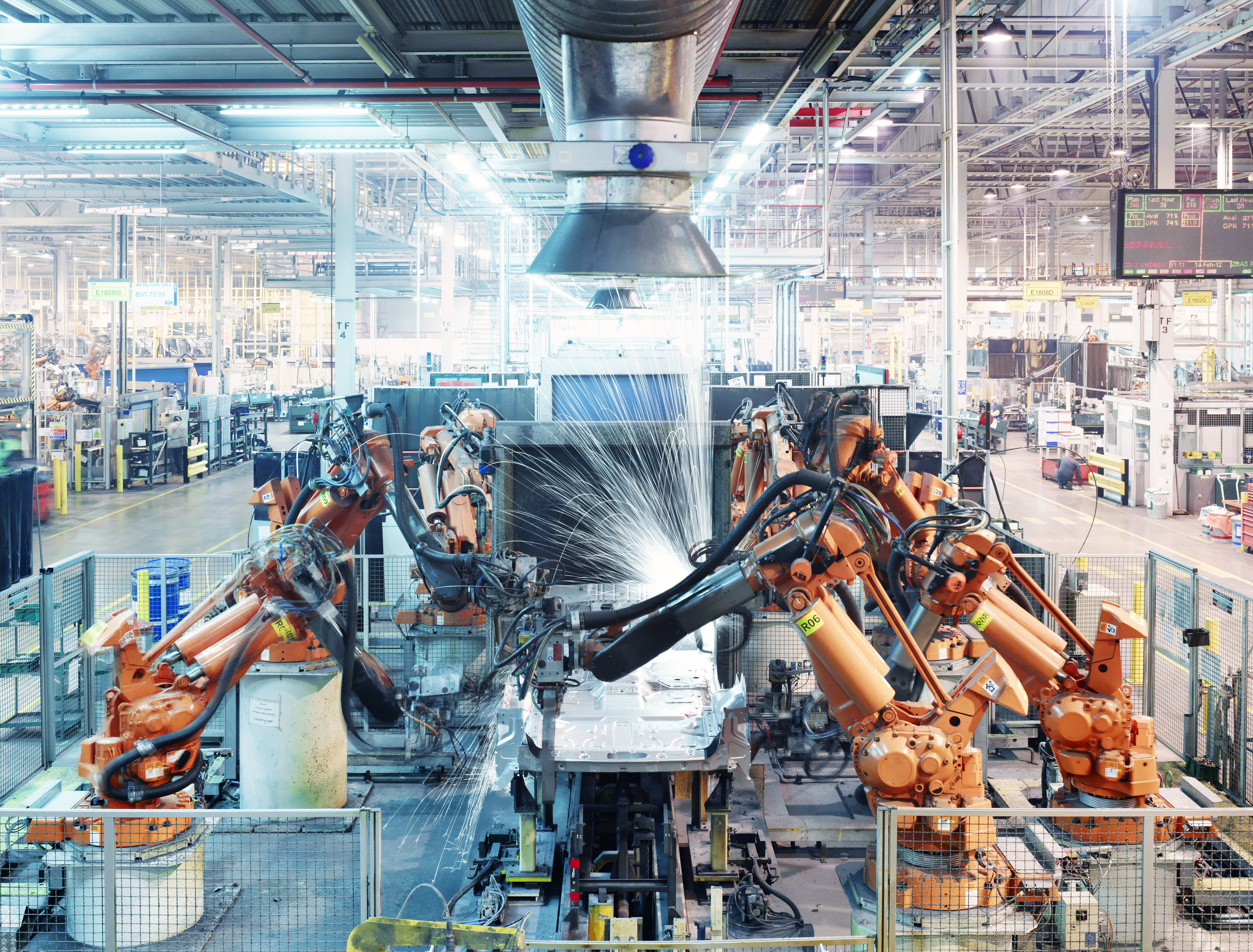
- The plant in 2012
- Operated: 1938 – present
- Location: Lode Lane, Solihull, England; B92 8NW
- Coordinates: 52.435081°N 1.779191°W
- Industry: Motor vehicle manufacture
- Products: Land Rover Series (1948–1985); Range Rover (since 1970); Land Rover Defender (1983–2016); Land Rover Discovery (1989–2018); Range Rover Sport (since 2006); Jaguar XE (2015–2016); Jaguar F-Pace (2016–2025); Range Rover Velar (since 2017)
- Employees: 10,700+
- Architect: British Government
- Owner: Jaguar Land Rover (division of Tata Motors Passenger Vehicles)

The Solihull plant is a car manufacturing factory on Lode Lane in Solihull, England, around 7 miles (11 km) to the southeast of Birmingham city centre. It is the largest Jaguar Land Rover factory. The plant sits on a 300-acre (120 ha) site and employs over 10,000 people in manufacturing. Some Land Rover vehicles are produced here, including the Range Rover Sport.

The plant was originally built by the UK Government in the 1930s and was used to manufacture aircraft engines during and shortly before World War II. It has previously been owned by the Rover Company and British Leyland; it is now owned by Tata Motors Passenger Vehicles.

== Shadow factory: 1936–1945 ==
Originally two farms, Wharhall and Fordrove, were purchased in 1936 by the British Government on which to build a shadow factory in preparation for any potential war with Nazi Germany. Construction was started almost immediately, with the factory complete as a shell and placed in mothballs in late 1938.

At the outbreak of World War II in September 1939, the factory was allocated to the Coventry-based Rover Company, who were assigned the task to build Bristol Hercules engines. Named No.2 Solihull, after starting fitting out initial production was undertaken in Acocks Green, with machined parts supplied from Drakelow. Rover took possession of the fitted-out factory in January 1940, and produced the first Rover-built Hercules engine in October 1940. The factory became a guarded and fortified location, and air raid shelters are still in the grounds of the plant. The oldest part of the Rover factory is the present day South Works, with its late 1930s art deco facade still with wartime camouflage.

The engines were to be used in either planes or tanks, specifically Bristol Beaufighters and Handley Page Halifaxes, but mainly Short Stirlings. Locally, the majority of engines were shipped to the Austin Motors Elmdon factory at Cofton Hackett, part of the Longbridge plant, which produced the Stirling.

In 2010 as part of the Land Rover Legacy Project, the Heritage Motor Centre sponsored a project to research and note the history of the factory.

== Rover Company: 1945–1967 ==
Rover's main Coventry car factory had been extensively damaged during the Nazi bombing of Coventry. Rover had negotiated an option to use the Solihull plant if their own was not viable to use at the war's end and in 1945 the Rover Company officially relocated from Coventry to the Lode Lane plant. As in the tradition of Rover previous main factories dating back to the original Starley and Sutton Rover Bicycle plant from Victorian times, the Solihull plant was named The Meteor Works. Car production started again in 1946, with the first new car to be produced at the factory the Rover P4, from 1949. As well as producing many Rover cars there until the late 1970s, the plant was also the development site of the Land Rover four-wheel drive vehicle in late 1947 and 1948. It is also the development site for Rover's other four wheel drive in the late 1960s, the Range Rover. The Land Rover instantly began out selling Rover cars from its beginning in 1948 and the Solihull plant has remained the home and birthplace of Land Rover ever since, being the principal assembly plant for both the classic Land Rover (both Series and Defender) and the full-size Range Rover for their entire production runs.

North Works was added to the Solihull site beginning in late 1956 as two storage warehouses. North Works became a complete factory of its own for the introduction of the Rover P6 car in October 1963. The Rover P6 was awarded the International Car of the Year for 1964.

== British Leyland: 1968–1978 ==
The Rover Company merged with Leyland Motors in 1967, which merged shortly afterwards with British Motor Holdings to create the British Leyland Motor Corporation a year later. Solihull continued to manufacture Rover cars, but the most significant new Rover product would be the Range Rover in 1970 - a model whose success would ultimately secure the plant's future in later decades. The factory was extended with Eastworks in 1975 for the new Rover SD1, a bold and futuristic design which would replace the older P6 models. However the plant was ravaged by the industrial strife that had crippled (and eventually bankrupted) the rest of BL, and the resulting quality problems meant the car never fulfilled its promise.

== Land Rover: 1978–2012 ==
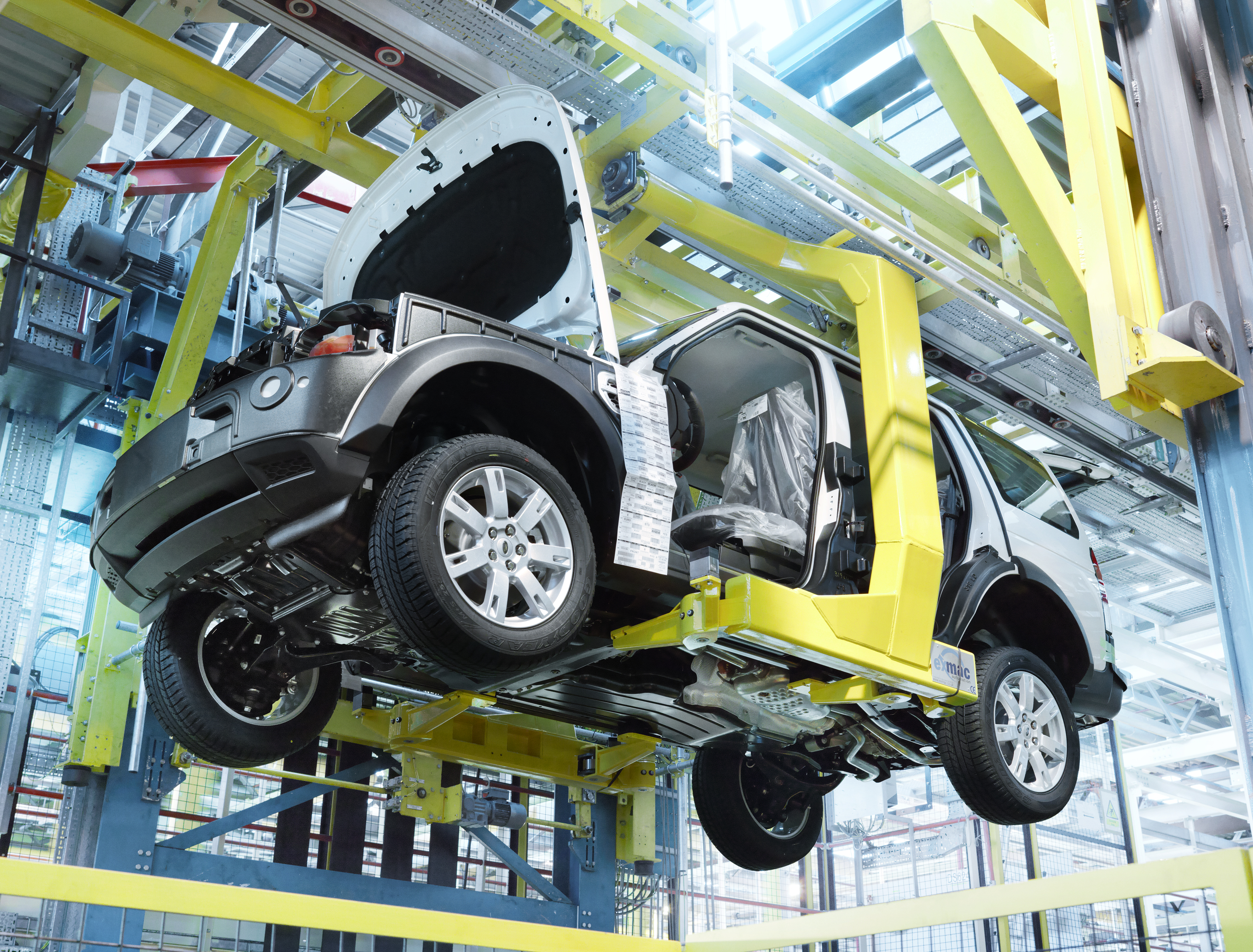
Land Rover Discovery 4 being built at Solihull plant. This was the 1,000,000th Discovery, all of which have been built at Solihull plant.

The rationalisation of car production in the late 1970s by British Leyland had almost wiped out all their major British car brands. At Solihull all car production, except for Land Rover vehicles, ceased at Lode Lane. Land Rover and Range Rover as specialist lines of the old Rover Company had remained relatively unscathed from the British Leyland bankruptcy and were split as separate operating company based there. The Rover SD1 assembly hall and paint shop were mothballed, and production of that car was moved to the former Morris plant in Cowley, Oxfordshire. All future Rover car production would take place both here, and at the Austin assembly plant in Longbridge. Following the de-merger of Jaguar from BL in 1984, the Range Rover became BL's flagship product and a stable situation existed from thereon, with new models such as the Discovery debuting in 1989, and the Freelander in 1998 - which finally made use of the old SD1 assembly hall. In 2000, the situation changed once again when BMW (by now the owners of the Rover Group - the successor to BL) decided to sell Land Rover (and the Solihull plant) to Ford.

In 2005, production of the Range Rover and the Range Rover Sport at the Solihull plant was temporarily interrupted by protestors from the environmental organization Greenpeace. The protesters infiltrated an assembly facility and temporarily delayed production of the vehicle. Greenpeace cited issues with greenhouse gas emissions, and by extension, global warming. The United States Environmental Protection Agency estimates for the non-supercharged car are 14 mpg_{‑US} (17 L/100 km; 17 mpg_{‑imp}) (combined). Although for this test the EPA used their newly calibrated system for 2008 and on. Greenpeace stated they did not take issue with the production of vehicles such as the Land Rover Defender as they are typically used for off-road applications on a much more frequent basis than vehicles such as the Range Rover Sport which they claim "has been tuned primarily for on road performance".

In March 2008, Ford finalised a deal to sell Jaguar and Land Rover to Tata Motors Passenger Vehicles – part of the Indian-based TATA Group, one of the world's largest manufacturers of commercial vehicles.

== Jaguar Land Rover: 2013–present ==
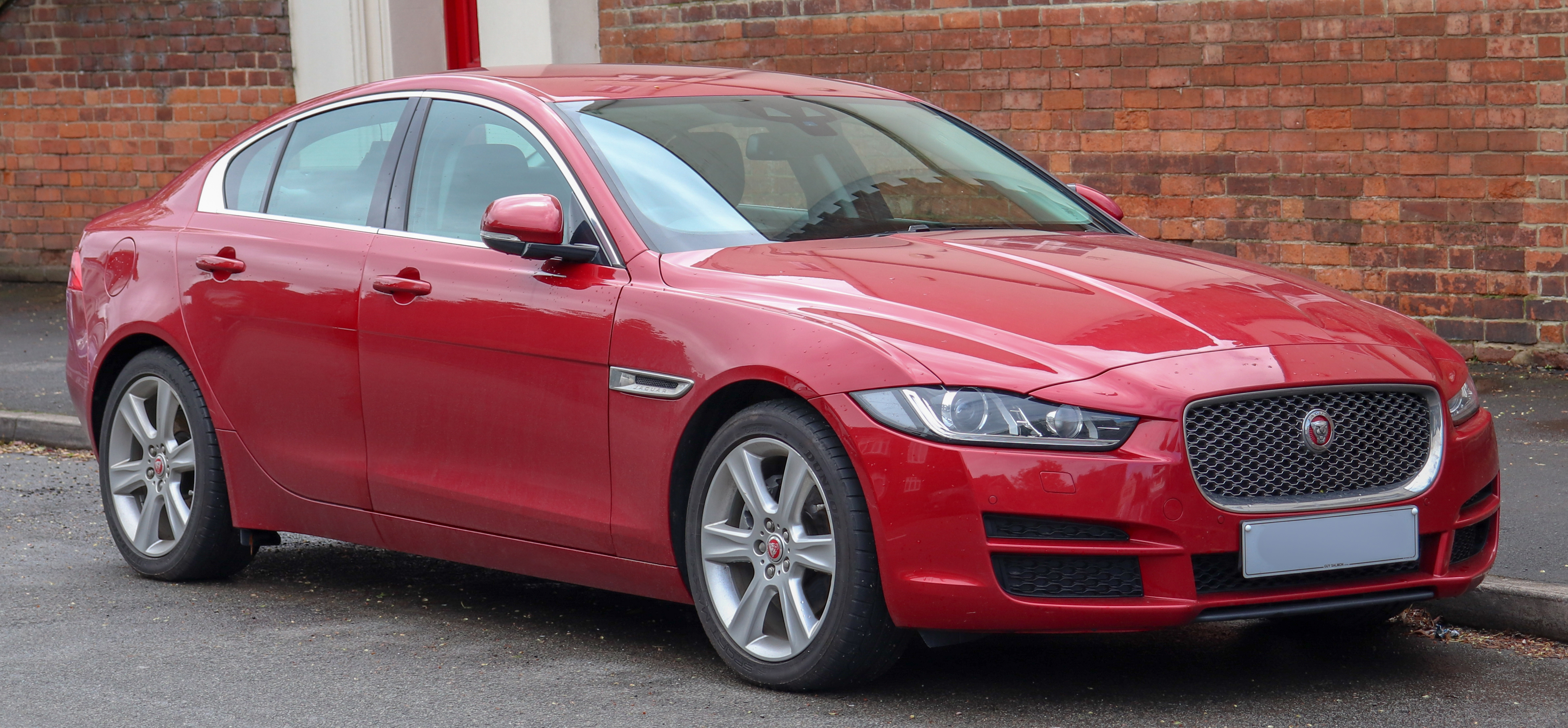
Jaguar XE produced at Solihull from April 2015 to Mid September 2016

Solihull has since benefited from massive investment in the run up to the launch of the fourth generation Range Rover in 2012 and second generation Range Rover Sport in 2013, following the installation of a new aluminium bodyshell production facility. The plant has now been designated as a "centre for excellence" for aluminium body technology. Production of the Jaguar XE, the first non-4x4 vehicle to be produced at the plant since 1981, began on 13 April 2015, and was followed by production of the Jaguar F-Pace in 2016. Sir Stirling Moss, Jaguar test driver Norman Dewis and motoring expert Quentin Willson led a procession of classic Jaguar and Land Rover models to celebrate the beginning of Jaguar production at Solihull, with Stirling Moss formally opening the new production facility. Production of the Jaguar XE moved to Castle Bromwich Assembly in 2016, at a cost of £100m.

== Land Rover test track ==
A test track for demonstrating the Land Rover's off-road ability to visiting guests was opened in 1949. The original track started at the boiler house and ran over the numerous wartime air raid shelters. It is believed to be the first purpose-built off-road demonstration track for public use. The majority of the air raid shelter track had been built over with new factory buildings by 1956. To overcome the loss of demonstration area the Jungle Track was added for use for guests visiting the factory and was known as Joyce's Jungle after the demonstrator driver, Alec Joyce. These areas are currently run by the Solihull Factory Land Rover Experience centre.

== Products ==
=== Current ===
- Land Rover Range Rover (1970–present)
- Land Rover Range Rover Sport (2005–present)
- Land Rover Range Rover Velar (2017–present)

=== Historical ===
- Jaguar XE (2015–2016)
- Jaguar F-Pace (2016–2025)
- Land Rover Series (1948–1985)
- Land Rover Defender (1983–2016)
- Land Rover Discovery (1989–2018)
  - Honda Crossroad (1993–1998) (Note: Honda Crossroad was a rebadged Land Rover Discovery)
- Land Rover Freelander (1997–2006)
- Rover P3 (1948–1949)
- Rover P4 (1949–1964)
- Rover P5 (1958–1973)
- Rover P6 (1963–1977)
- Rover SD1 (1976–1981)
- Triumph TR7 (1980–1981)
