= Saab V8 =

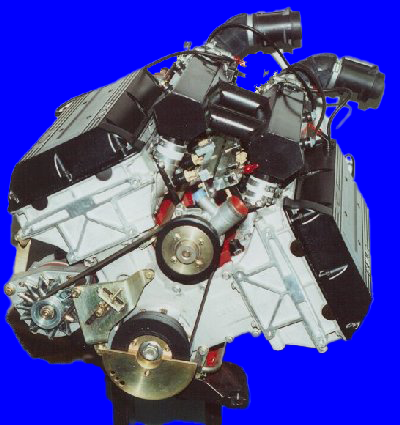

Overview
- Manufacturer: Valmet
- Also called: Valmet TF
- Production: 1971-1982

Layout
- Configuration: V8
- Displacement: 3,970 cc (242.3 cu in)
- Cylinder bore: 90 mm (3.5 in)
- Piston stroke: 78 mm (3.1 in)
- Valvetrain: DOHC

Combustion
- Fuel type: Petrol
- Oil system: Wet sump
- Cooling system: Water-cooled

The Saab V8 is a V8 engine developed for Saab Automobile by Saab-Valmet. Only five prototype engines were built, with one being extensively road tested. The V8 engine was never put into production.

== History ==
When the Saab 99 model was launched in 1968, it was powered by an inline-four engine sourced from the Triumph Motor Company in the UK. The slant-four was part of a family of engines that later also included a V8. Saab evaluated the Triumph V8 in the Saab 99; 28 cars were said to have been fitted with the British V8. Saab did not put a V8-powered 99 into production. Instead they first brought production of the Triumph four-cylinder engine in-house, and then undertook two engine redesigns, the first resulting in the Saab B engine in 1972, and the second resulting in the Saab H engine in 1981.

In the 1980s Robert Sinclair, Saab-Scania's US president, worked to move the brand up-market. He said his desire was to "...add content, add performance, add sparkle and luster to the brand." Sinclair felt a V8 was needed for the US market.

Sinclair presented the idea to Juhani Linnoinen, director of Saab-Valmet's factory in Uusikaupunki, Finland, during a meeting in the United States. On his return home before Christmas 1987 Linnoinen assembled a small team to begin design of the engine. The team consisted of Test Department head Simo Vuorio, Hannu Häyrinen of the Prototypes Department, and Chief Mechanic Kari Kuusrainen.

Keeping costs down was an important factor, so as many existing parts were used as possible. The new engine also had to fit transversely in the nose of a Saab 9000. (The Lancia Thema 8.32 of 1986 had shown that it was possible to mount a V8 in the Type Four platform also used by the 9000.) The team fabricated a test engine block out of two four-cylinder blocks joined at the crank. To fit the engine the team also designed a new gearbox case and clutch housing.

In August 1988 Linnoinen contacted Jouko Tommila, head of what was then the Valmet diesel factory in Linnavuori, Finland. Linnoinen wanted Valmet to fabricate the engine. Another small team was assembled, consisting of Chief Engineer Mauno Ylivakeri, Head Designer Kalevi Salminen, Development Team Manager Timo Mäkinen, and Jarmo Kallio who was responsible for testing. The team at Valmet would be responsible for building the engine and adapting the car. The engine, named the Valmet TF for Twin Four, was to be ready by the end of summer 1989.

Parts sufficient to build 10 engines were produced, and 5 complete engines were assembled. The first engine assembled was run on a test bed for an extended time, with the only problem being a slight vibration of the crankshaft, which was solved by adding counterweights.

The completed engine fit into the 9000 without any body modifications, and was first taken out on the road on 3 May 1989. After 6 months of testing in the Linnavuori district, during which at least one speeding ticket was received, the car was sent to Spain and Germany for additional trials. The car covered an estimated 65,000 km (40,389.1 mi) in total. Reviews of the car were positive, and plans were made for a new factory to produce an anticipated 30,000 engines per year once approved.

Having a large V8 engine in a Saab was felt to be at odds with the company's philosophy, and in particular Per Gillbrand, developer of Saab's famous turbocharged engine, was not enthused about the prospect of a V8 in a Saab. The engine's fuel consumption was also quite high; an estimated 10 L/100 km (23.5 mpg_{‑US}).

In 1989 General Motors acquired a 50% interest in Saab, and their 54° Ellesmere V6 was subsequently used in both the 900 and 9000. The Saab V8 project was cancelled.

Four Saab V8 engines are known to exist. One is in the factory museum at Linnavuori, and three more are in the Saab museum in Uusikaupunki; one installed in a Saab 9000 and two more on a stand. The remaining V8 parts were returned to the factory in Uusikaupunki, but their current location is unknown.

Apart from the badge-engineered Saab 9-7X, the only other Saab to have a factory-installed V8 was a Saab 9-5 with a prototype GM XV8 engine mounted for evaluation.

== Technical features ==
The Saab V8 had a 90° included angle between cylinder banks, four camshafts, and 4 valves per cylinder for a total of 32 valves. Both cylinder heads were from the Saab B202 engine, but to arrange for intake ports on both sides of the vee to be inside the valley and exhausts to be outside, flow through one head was reversed; the intake ports became exhausts and vice versa. Pistons and connecting rods were also standard Saab B202 parts. The block was cast at the Valmet Rautpohja plant in Jyväskylä. The crankshafts were machined at the Linnavuori plant.

The completed engine weighed 217 kg (478.4 lb), about 60 kg (132.3 lb) heavier than the B202. It produced 280 hp (208.8 kW), and 243 ft⋅lb (330 N⋅m) of torque.
