= Slant =

Slant can refer to:

== Bias ==
- Bias or other non-objectivity in journalism, politics, academia or other fields

== Technical ==
- Slant range, in telecommunications, the line-of-sight distance between two points which are not at the same level
- Slant drilling (or Directional drilling), the practice of drilling non-vertical wells
- Slant height, is the distance from any point on the circle to the apex of a right circular cone

== Automotive ==
- Slant-4 engine (disambiguation), a type of car engine
- Triumph Slant-4 engine, an engine developed by Triumph
- Chrysler Slant-6 engine, an engine developed by Chrysler
- R40 (New York City Subway car), Slant version.

== Publications ==
- Slant (journal), a Catholic journal
- The Slant, a student humor magazine at Vanderbilt University
- / (novel) (or Slant), a book by science fiction writer Greg Bear
- Slant Magazine, a film, TV, and music review website
- Slant (fanzine), a fanzine by Walt Willis, winner of the 1954 Retrospective Hugo Award for Best Fanzine
- Slant Six Games, a video game developer founded in 2005

== Bands ==
- The Slant (band), an American alternative rock band from Pittsburgh, Pennsylvania
- Slant (band), a South Korean hardcore punk band
- Slant 6 or Slant, an all-female punk rock trio based in Washington, D.C.
- The Slants, an American dance-rock group (and nonprofit organization) from Portland, Oregon

== Other ==
- A growth medium such as agar set in an inclined glass tube for growing microbiological cultures.
- Slant (route), an American football play pattern.
- Slant (handwriting), an attribute of Western handwriting
- A racial slur for people of Asian descent, in reference to the shape of their eyes; see List of ethnic slurs
- Gokigen Naname, a logic puzzle also known as Slant.

== See also ==
- Piccadilly Slant-Abraham's Cove, a designated place in the province of Newfoundland and Labrador
