= Gran Sport =

Gran Sport may refer to:

- Buick Gran Sport, 1970s sports car
- Maserati Gran Sport, 2000s sports car
- Alfa Romeo Gran Sport Quattroruote, 1960s car
