= Asardo =

Defunct American motor vehicle manufacturer

Asardo 1500 AR-S
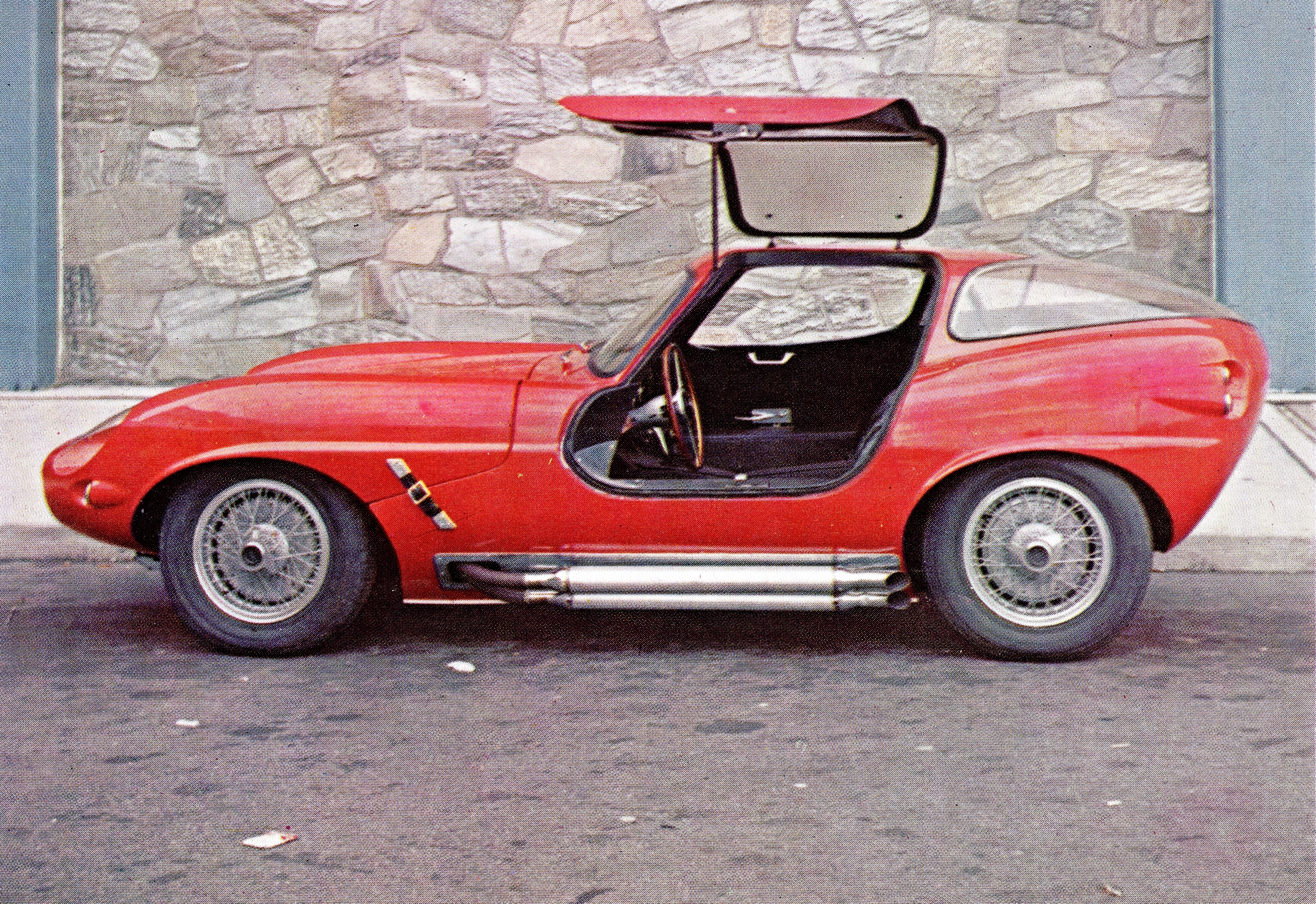
- 1959 Asardo 1500 AR-S

Overview
- Manufacturer: American Special Automotive Research and Design Organization
- Assembly: United States: North Bergen, New Jersey
- Designer: Helmut Schlosser

Body and chassis
- Class: Sportscar
- Body style: berlinetta
- Layout: front-engine, rear-wheel-drive
- Doors: Gullwing doors

Powertrain
- Engine: 1.5 L Alfa Romeo DOHC 8V I4 (gasoline)
- Transmission: 4-speed manual

Dimensions
- Wheelbase: 2,235 mm (88.0 in)
- Length: 3,810 mm (150.0 in)
- Width: 1,626 mm (64.0 in)
- Height: 1,168 mm (46.0 in)
- Kerb weight: 612 kg (1,349 lb)

Chronology
- Predecessor: none
- Successor: none

Asardo is a brand of sports car built in the United States. The first car was built in 1959 and subsequently modified by the designer in 1961. Only one was ever built.

== History ==
"Asardo" is an acronym for "American Special Automotive Research and Design Organization". The company's founder and chief designer was mechanical engineer Helmut Schlosser, an Austrian who had emigrated to the United States. In the late 1950s he was managing a machine shop in North Bergen, New Jersey. Schlosser was interested in sports cars, at one time owning a Siata with a Stanguellini engine.

Schlosser had completed the design for what would become the Asardo by 1957, and construction began in 1958.

== 1500 AR-S ==
For the Asardo 1500 AR-S Schlosser produced a compact curvaceous berlinetta body in fiberglass. The appearance of the front of the car has been compared to the Maserati 300S and the rear to some Ferraris. The car's gullwing doors were reminiscent of the Mercedes-Benz 300SL and in fact used Mercedes hinges and latches with a custom hold-up strut. The dashboard was from a Volkswagen Karmann Ghia as was the windshield, which was cut to fit. The bucket seats were from a Porsche Speedster. The electrical accessories were courtesy of Lucas.

The chassis was a multi-tubular space frame. The front suspension used upper and lower A-arms from the Alfa Romeo Giulietta, coil springs and an anti-roll bar. The rear suspension also used many Giulietta parts, with a solid axle and alloy Alfa differential carrier on coil springs with trailing arms and an A-arm for lateral location. Koni telescopic shock-absorbers were used all four corners, as were Borrani wire wheels with knock-off spinners. Brakes were Girling/Alfa Romeo drums front and Alfin drums rear. Steering was the ZF-Gemmer worm-and-ball system used in the Alfas.

The engine in the Asardo 1500 AR-S was the Alfa Romeo Twin Cam straight-four engine. In the Giulietta this engine displaced 1,290 cc (78.7 cu in) but for the Asardo its bore was increased from 74 mm to 79.5 mm with custom pistons and wet liners from Mahle so that its final displacement was 1,489 cc (90.9 cu in). The Asardo's engine had a compression ratio of 11.5:1 and was equipped with two two-barrel Weber 40mm DCOE3 carburetors. Power output for the engine was estimated to have been 100.7 kW (135 hp) at 6800 rpm. Power went from the engine to the rear axle through an Alfa Romeo four-speed manual transmission.

The car was taken to the Lime Rock track, where driver Dolph Vilardi recorded lap times of 1 minute 16 seconds even though the engine mixture was too lean and only three-quarter throttle was used. Top speed was estimated to be 217 km/h (134.8 mph).

The Asardo debuted at the 1959 New York auto show. It was listed at a suggested price of US$5875.00 and was to be built at a rate of two cars per month in a new production facility in Weehawken, New Jersey. Schlosser and his financial backers disagreed about how the car would be sold. The financiers wanted to offer the Asardo as a partially completed car that allowed the buyer to choose their engine while Schlosser insisted that the car be sold complete with the Alfa engine. They parted ways over the difference and Schlosser went to Europe in search of alternate financing.

== 3500 GM-S ==
Schlosser spent most of 1960 searching unsuccessfully for new backers. When he returned to the United States late that year former New York Giant turned auto dealer and racing driver Charlie Kolb with Florida VW/Porsche dealer Overkey Motors engaged Schlosser to redesign the Asardo to accept the Buick "215" aluminum V8 then under development at General Motors. Schlosser redesigned the chassis to make room for the new engine but kept the same body. The 3,524 cc (215.0 cu in) Buick engine and a Corvette transmission were installed in the car. Schlosser had designed an independent suspension system for the rear of the car but did not have the opportunity to install it, so the Alfa differential remained. The revised Asardo was renamed the 3500 GM-S.

== In competition and later history ==
Vilardi raced the car in 1959 and was able to post a third place in the Montgomery preliminary on August 8 and a fourth place at the Lime Rock preliminary on October 17. After this Kolb made some track appearances.

At various times the car has been owned by collectors in the United States, Japan, Germany and Spain. The Buick V8 has also been replaced with a 1600cc Alfa Romeo engine. The original 1500cc engine is reported to have languished behind an Alfa dealer in California for several years before being sold.

== Alfa Romeo Giulia TZ controversy ==
In his 2002 book "Alfa Romeo TZ - Zagato Autodelta Conrero", author, racing driver and classic car dealer Philippe Olczyk suggested that the Asardo had strongly influenced the design of the Alfa Romeo Giulia TZ sports racer and that the car could be viewed as the first unofficial TZ prototype. Many in the motoring press and Alfa enthusiast community reacted with skepticism, pointing to significant differences between the cars.
