= Slant-4 engine =

Slant four or Slant-4 was a name given to several unrelated engines produced by different manufacturers. These were all in-line four-cylinder engines with cylinders inclined from vertical. They include:

- Vauxhall Slant-4 engine (a planned V8 version never materialized)
- Triumph Slant-4 engine (4-cylinder variant of Triumph V8)
  - Saab B engine (a version of the Triumph Slant-4 engine built by Saab with modifications)
  - Saab H engine (a redesigned Saab B engine built by Saab - a planned Saab V8 was never put to production)

Other inline four-cylinder engines with a similar layout but without the official name, include:

- Pontiac Trophy 4 engine (4-cylinder variant of Pontiac V8 engine)
- International Harvester Comanche 4 (4-cylinder variant of International Harvester Comanche V8)
- Lotus 900 series (a planned production V8 never materialized, but did appear in the Lotus Etna concept car)
- Hillman Imp engine
- Volvo Redblock Engine
- Most BMW straight-4 engines
