= Alfa Romeo 1750 Berlina =

Alfa Romeo 1750 Berlina Alfa Romeo 2000 Berlina
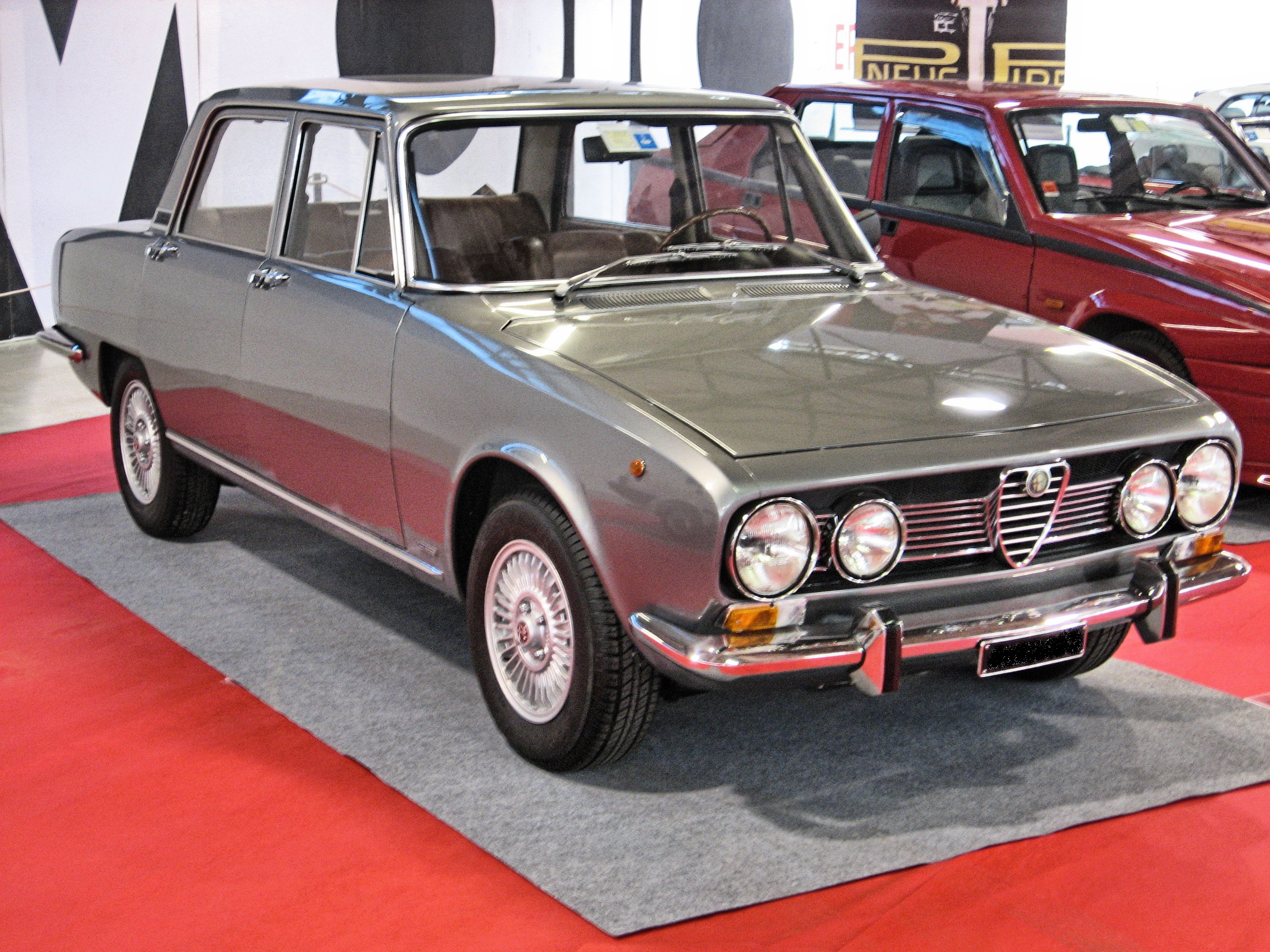
- Alfa Romeo 1750 Berlina (2nd Series)

Overview
- Manufacturer: Alfa Romeo
- Production: 1968–1977
- Assembly: Italy: Arese, Milan; South Africa: Rosslyn, Gauteng
- Designer: Bertone

Body and chassis
- Class: Executive car (E)
- Body style: 4-door notchback saloon
- Layout: Front-engine, rear-wheel-drive
- Related: Alfa Romeo Giulia

Powertrain
- Engine: 1.8 L Twin Cam I4; 2.0 L Twin Cam I4
- Transmission: 5-speed manual 3-speed ZF automatic

Dimensions
- Wheelbase: 2,570 mm (101.2 in)
- Length: 4,390 mm (172.8 in)
- Width: 1,565 mm (61.6 in)
- Kerb weight: 1750: 1,108 kg (2,443 lb); 2000: 1,175 kg (2,590 lb)

Chronology
- Successor: Alfa Romeo Alfetta

The Alfa Romeo 1750 Berlina and Alfa Romeo 2000 Berlina (both 105 series) were executive cars produced by Italian car manufacturer Alfa Romeo from 1968 to 1977. Berlina is the Italian term for a saloon car. Both cars had Alfa Romeo twin cam inline-four engines; the 1.8-litre 1750 Berlina was made from 1968 to 1971, when it was phased out in favour of the improved 2.0-litre 2000 Berlina.

== 1750 Berlina ==
The 1.8-litre 1750 series cars were introduced by Alfa Romeo in 1968. The 1750 Berlina four-door notchback saloon was presented to the international press in January 1968 in Vietri sul Mare (Salerno), together with the 1750 GT Veloce coupé and Spider Veloce. Some days later it was displayed at the Brussels Motor Show.

The 1750 Berlina was based on the existing Giulia saloon, which continued in production. The 1750 was meant to top the saloon range, above the 1300 and 1600 cc versions of the Giulia. In the United States, however, the Giulia saloon ceased to be available and was entirely replaced by the 1750 Berlina. The 1750 entered full production in South Africa in early 1969, later complemented by the 2000.

In contrast to the Giulia, the 1750s had reworked bodywork and a bigger engine, shared many parts with other concurrent models in the Alfa Romeo range, but sold many fewer units during their production span.

The 1750 bodyshell had a 60 mm (2.4 in) longer wheelbase than that of the Giulia, and revised external panels, but it shared many of the same internal panels. The windscreen was also the same. The revisions were carried out by Bertone, and while it resembled the Giulia some of that vehicle's distinctive creases were smoothed out, and there were significant changes to the trim details. The car's taillights were later used on the De Tomaso Longchamp and Maserati Khamsin. They were also installed on some Alfa Romeo Junior Z, De Tomaso Pantera, Maserati Ghibli and late-model Lamborghini Espada.

The car has a 1779 cc twin-carb engine and hydraulic clutch. The 1.8 L engine produced 118 PS (87 kW; 116 hp) with two twin sidedraught carburettors. For the US market the 1750 was equipped with SPICA fuel injection. In November 1969 the 1750 received some minor changes, including side blinker lights at front, a wood-rimmed steering wheel, and top-hinged pedals. This model is referred to as the second series.

In 1971, the 1750 Berlina was fitted with an experimental three-speed ZF automatic gearbox. The model designation was 1750A Berlina. According to official Alfa Romeo archives, 252 units were produced with very few surviving to this day. Some of 1750A Berlina didn't have the model plate with production date embossed. The automatic gearbox wasn't well-suited to the four-cylinder motor due to baulky shifting and ill-chosen gear ratio. Because of this, its fuel consumption was frighteningly high and acceleration was a bit too slow.

During 1971 the 1750 series was superseded across the Alfa Romeo range by the 2000 series; at the top of the saloon line, the 1750 Berlina gave way to the 2000 Berlina. Some 83 final 1750 Berlinas were assembled in 1972. A direct replacement in the 1.8-litre saloon class came that same year, in the form of the all-new Alfa Romeo Alfetta.

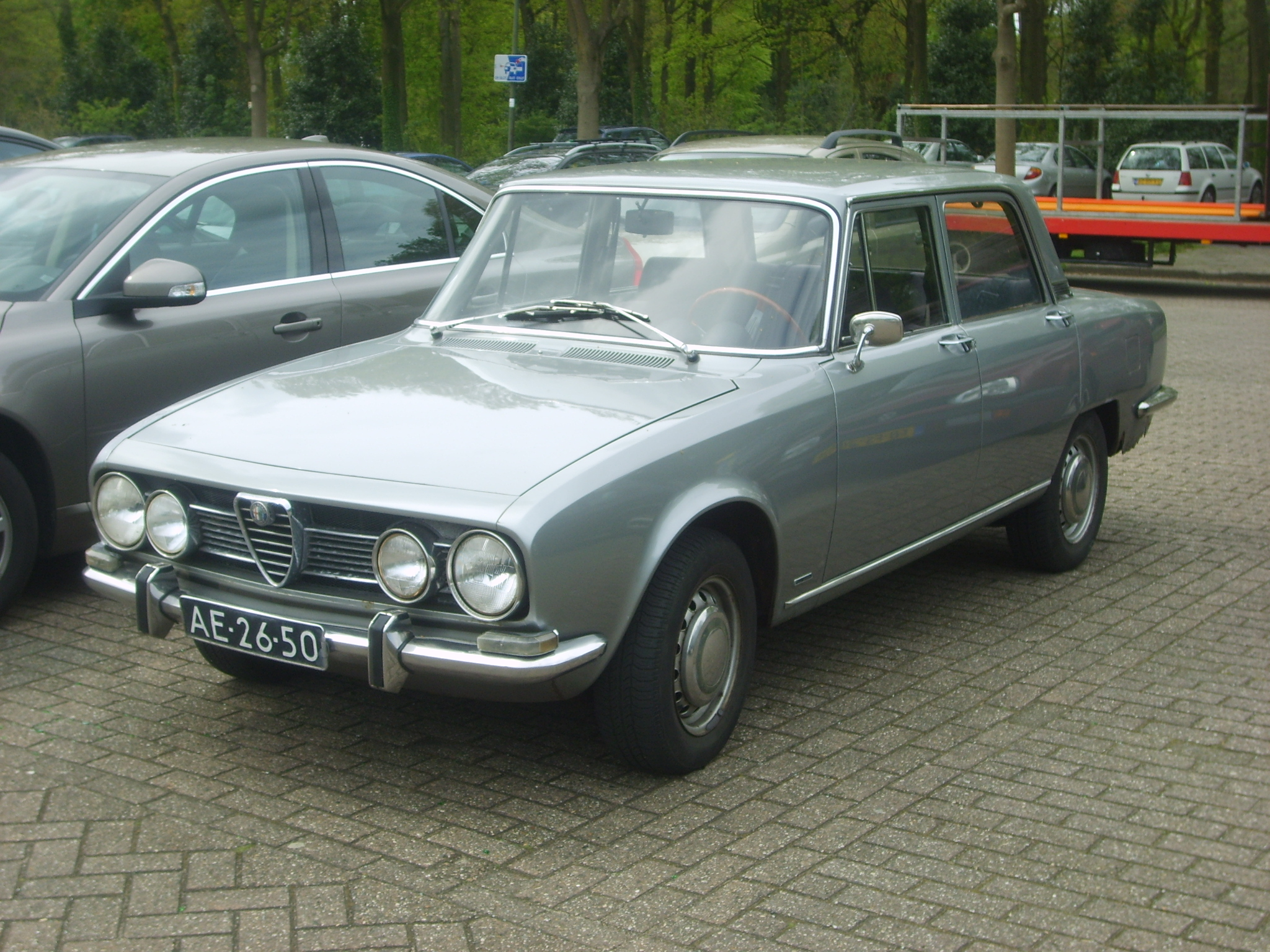
1968 Alfa Romeo 1750 Berlina (1st series)

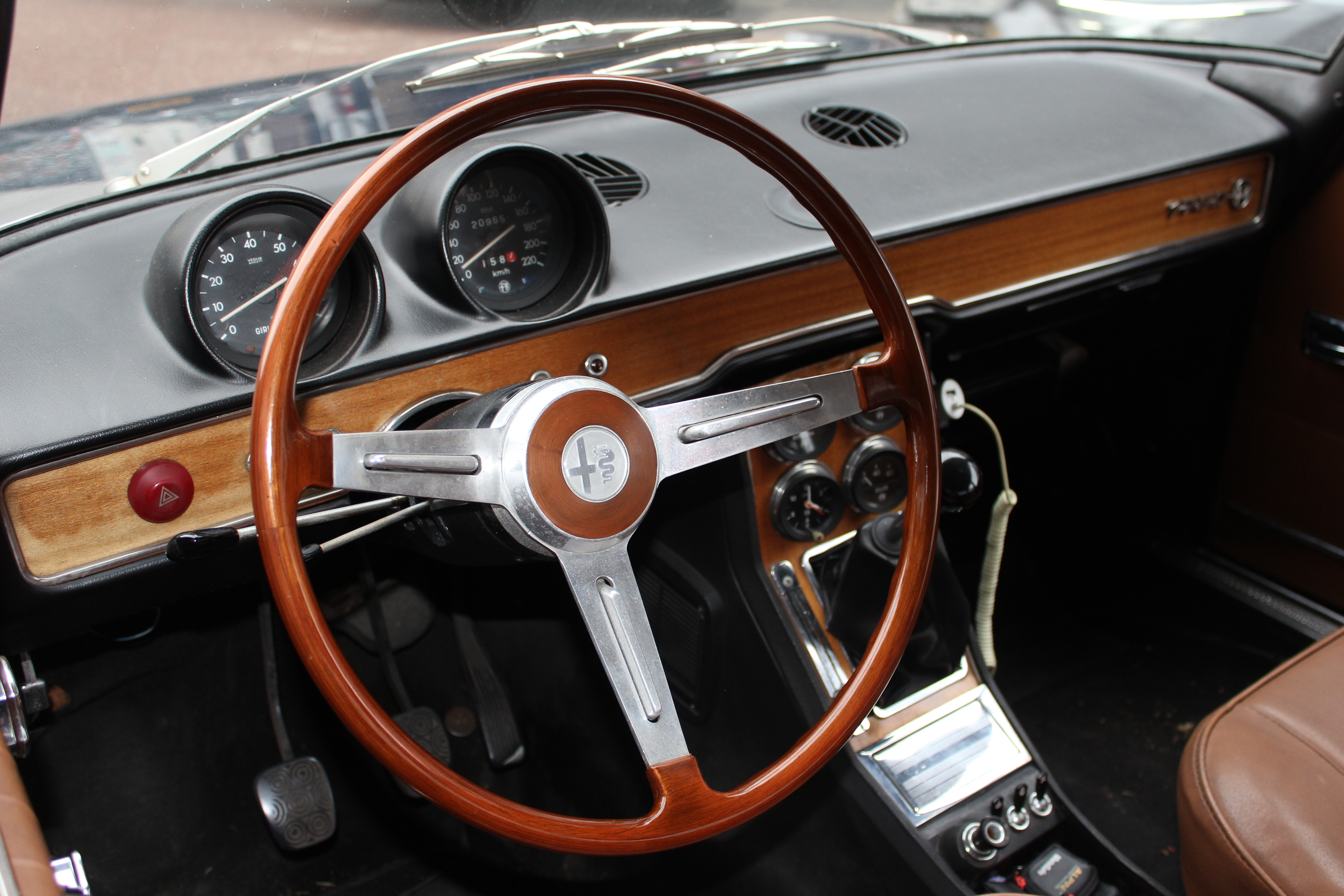
1970 Alfa Romeo 1750 Berlina (2nd series), interior

== 2000 Berlina ==
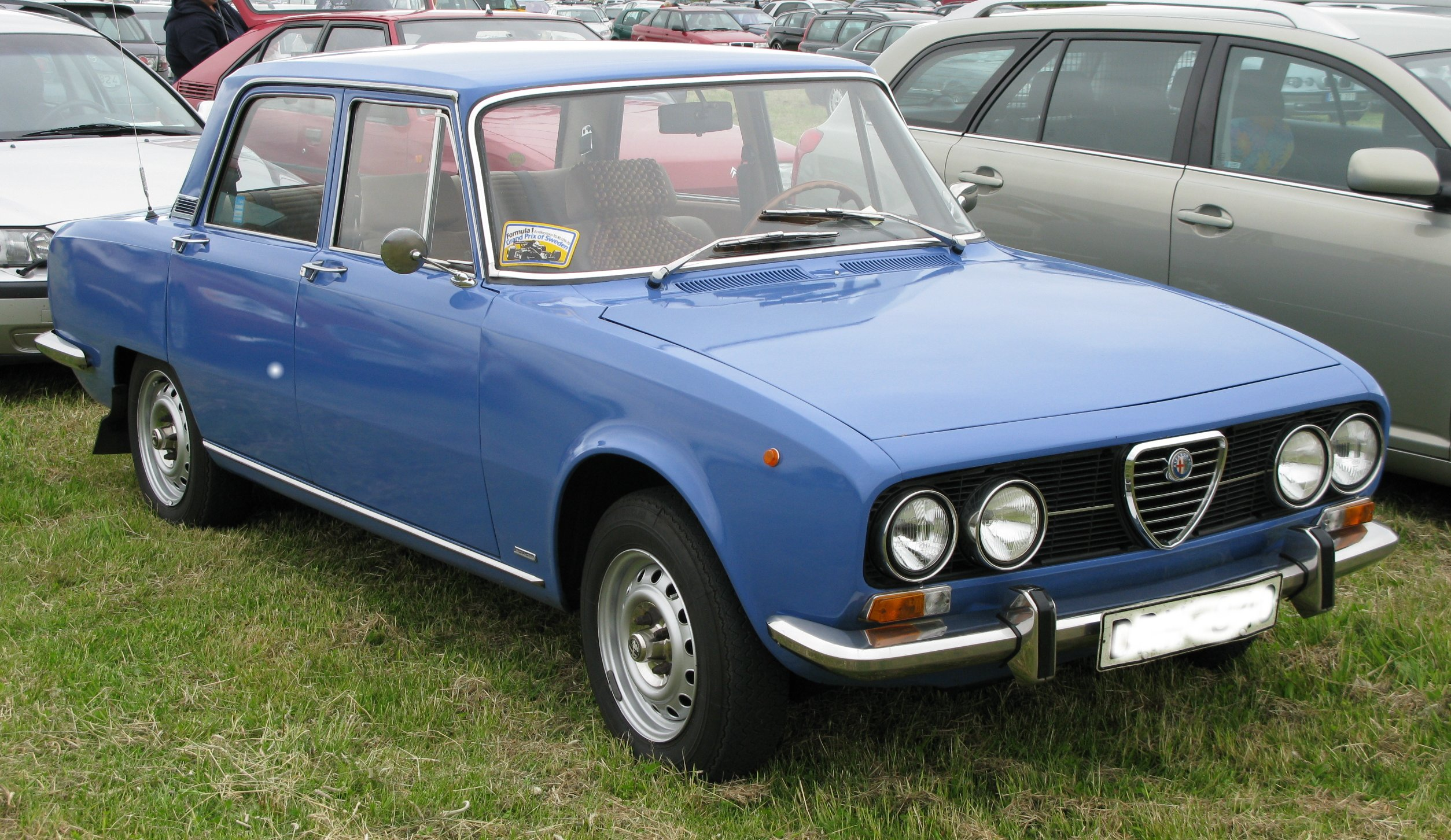
Alfa Romeo 2000 Berlina

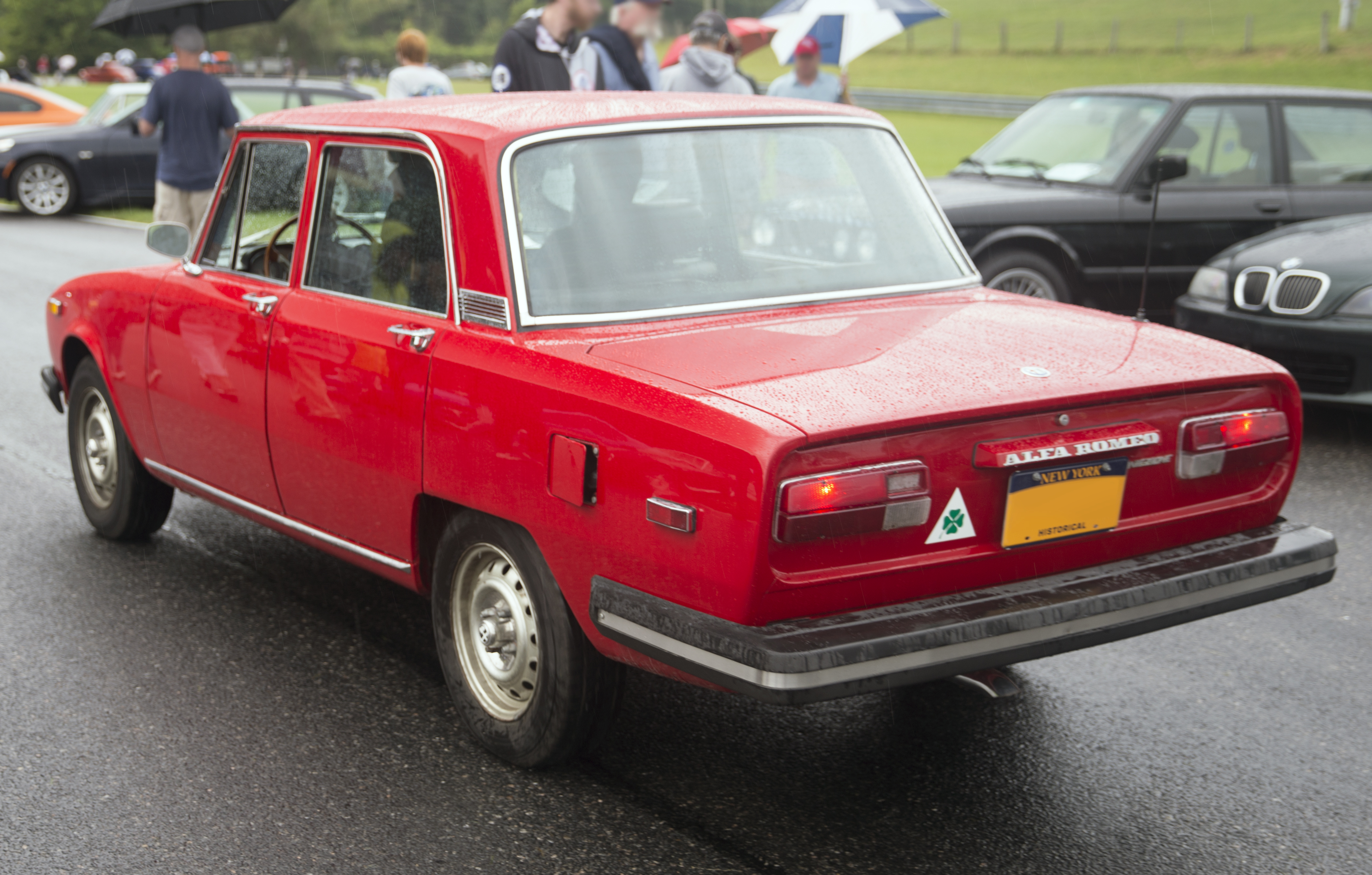
1974 Alfa Romeo 2000 Berlina Iniezione (US model)

The Alfa Romeo 2000 Berlina was produced by Alfa Romeo from 1971 to 1977. The engine was bored and stroked out to 1,962 cc. A different grille distinguishes 2000 from 1750. Also, external lights were different between the models. The 1750 had 7 inch diameter outboard headlights, whereas the 2000 had 5 3/4 inch diameter in all four positions. The tail light clusters were also of a simpler design on the 1750. New taillights were installed on many sports cars, including: Alfa Romeo Junior Z, Bricklin SV-1; De Tomaso Longchamp, Pantera; some Lamborghini Espada (US-spec); Maserati Bora/Merak, Ghibli, Khamsin. With two carburetors, this 2 litre Alfa Romeo Twin Cam engine produces 132 PS (97 kW; 130 hp). Top speed was 190 km/h (118 mph) and 0-100 km/h (62 mph) acceleration took 9 seconds. Gearbox was 5-speed manual (also 3-speed automatic on some versions).

The federalized spec 2000 Berlina was built from 1972 until 1974, with remaining stock being sold into 1976. For the US, the engine was equipped with mechanical fuel injection and late cars received catalytic converters. Late US-model cars also received safety bumpers made of black rubber with a centre chrome ribbon. 3,395 2000 Berlina were sold in the United States, of which 1,453 reportedly received a catalytic converter.

In 1977 the Alfetta 2000, a two-litre upmarket Alfetta version, replaced the 2000 Berlina. The 2000 Berlina was produced in 89,840 examples, of which 2,200 units were fitted with automatic gearboxes.

== Production ==
Model	Production Date	Production Number
1750 Berlina Series 1	1968–1969	49,987
1750 Berlina Series 2	1969–1971	40,759
1750 Berlina Injection	1969–1971	11,137
1750A Berlina	1971	252
2000 Berlina	1971–1977	87,640
2000A Berlina	1971–1977	2,200
Total Production (Unofficial Figures)		191,972

Year	1967	1968	1969	1970	1971	1972	Sum
1750 Berlina	2.243	28.619	22.697	29.968	16.519	74	100.120
1750 GTV	919	11.621	10.159	13.454	5.629	8	41.790
1750 Spider	854	1.227	1.199	658	734	0	4.672
1750 USA (Berlina, GTV, Spider)	0	547	2.513	2.227	2.962	34	8.283
2000 Berlina	0	0	0	0	15.416	33.035	48.451
2000 GTV	0	0	0	0	6.949	12.134	19.083
2000 Spider	0	0	0	0	811	1.893	2.704
2000 USA (Berlina, GTV, Spider)	0	0	0	0	16	3.231	3.247
Sum	4.016	42.014	36.568	46.307	49.036	50.409	228.350
