= Alfa Romeo Tipo 103 =

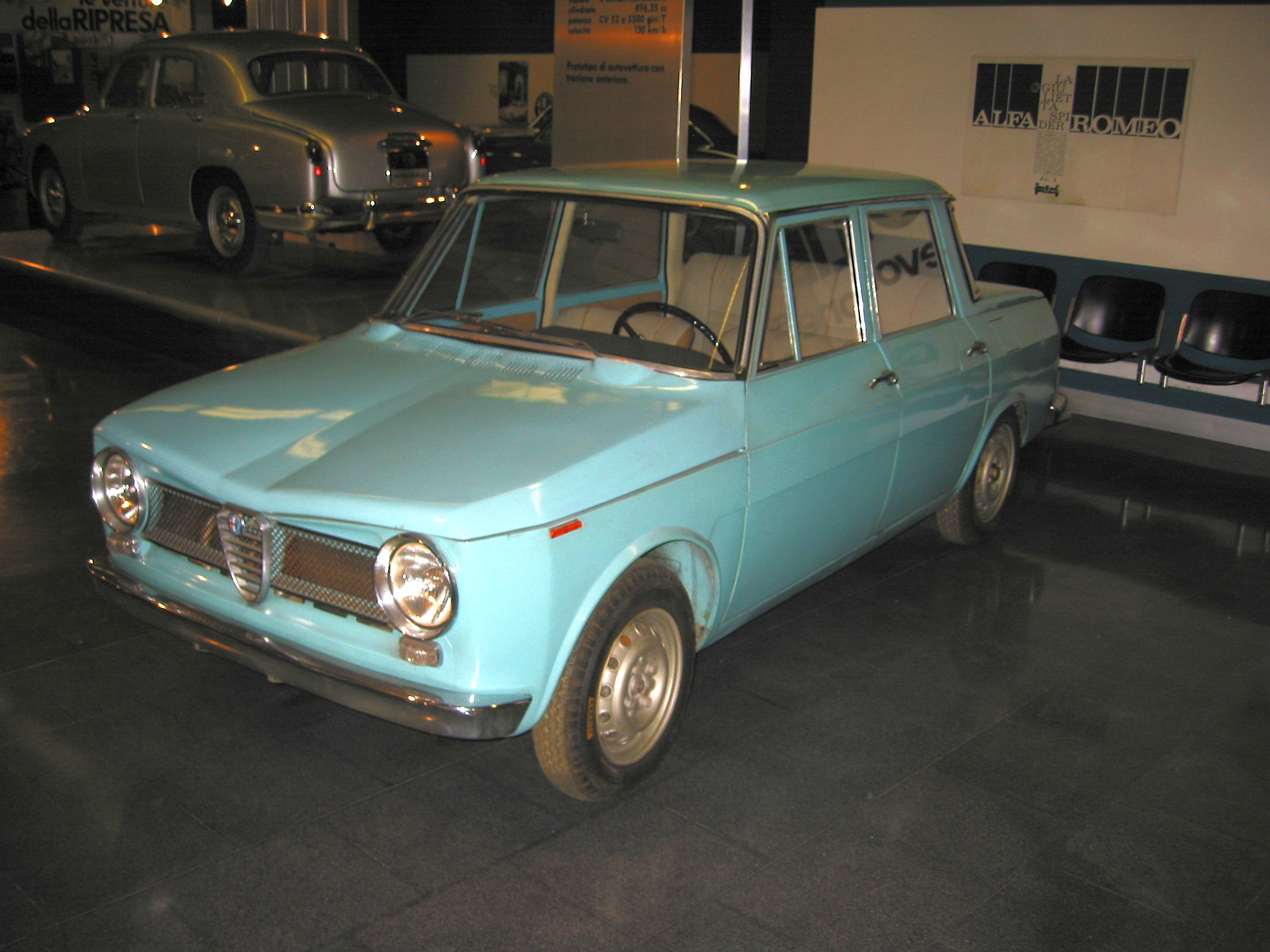
- Alfa Romeo Tipo 103

Overview
- Manufacturer: Alfa Romeo
- Production: 1960
- Assembly: Italy

Body and chassis
- Class: Subcompact car
- Body style: 4-door berlina
- Layout: Front-engine, front-wheel-drive

Powertrain
- Engine: 896 cc (54.7 cu in) I4
- Transmission: 4-speed manual

Dimensions
- Wheelbase: 2,230 mm (87.8 in)
- Length: 3,630 mm (142.9 in)
- Width: 1,500 mm (59.1 in)
- Height: 1,300 mm (51.2 in)
- Kerb weight: 725 kg (1,598 lb)

Chronology
- Successor: Alfa Romeo Alfasud

The Alfa Romeo Tipo 103 is a sub-compact front-wheel drive automobile developed by Alfa Romeo in the late 1950s. A prototype powered by a 0.9 L double overhead cam inline-four engine was completed in 1960. Alfa did not put the Tipo 103 into production.

== Background ==
After World War II Alfa Romeo moved to reinvent itself as a major auto manufacturer instead of a builder of small numbers of expensive high-performance sports and luxury cars. In 1950 they introduced the Alfa Romeo 1900, a mid-sized berlina that was the first Alfa built on a production line. In 1954 the even smaller Giulietta was released to broaden the appeal of the brand.

At the April 1954 Turin Auto Show where the Giulietta debuted, Rudolf Hruska told Alfa mechanical engineer Giuseppe Busso that Finmeccanica, the mechanical industry sub-holding of the Italian government's public holding company IRI and Alfa's `owners', planned to develop a microcar. Hruska was a consulting engineer for Finmeccanica until 1954, when he was appointed Alfa's technical manager.

Prior to that conversation Busso had done preliminary design work for three front-wheel drive concepts. His first was done in 1946 while still at Ferrari, and a second was done in 1948 after he moved to Alfa Romeo. The third, started in April 1952, was code-named Project 13-61 and was a design for a car powered by a two-cylinder engine mounted transversely driving the front wheels. Project 13-61 did not make it to the prototype stage before the development of the Giulietta took precedence. Busso believed that if the development of the 13-61 had been allowed to continue, Alfa could have released a front-wheel drive microcar with a transverse engine in 1956, three years ahead of the Mini.

Busso reviewed these earlier studies following the conversation in Turin, and in December Alfa's senior management met with him and his team to assess them as well. Preliminary work was allowed to proceed, but it was not until 1957 that the features of the new car began to be settled. Air-cooling was considered and rejected, as was a boxer engine configuration, while use of front-wheel drive was approved. Displacement was to be 900 cc. The first drawings are dated January 1958.

In February 1958, Hruska set December of that year as the deadline for delivery of a complete set of drawings, with production to start in 1961.

In October 1958 Hruska left Alfa and new managing director Mangano christened the microcar development "Project V" and set a slightly lower displacement target of 850 cc.

In October 1958 Renault and Alfa Romeo signed an agreement of cooperation that led to Renault Dauphines/Ondines and R4s being assembled under license in the Alfa Romeo Portello Plant and Renault distributing Alfas in France. The first Alfa-built Dauphine rolled off the assembly line on June 4, 1959 and production of these licensed cars continued until 1966.

The prototype Tipo 103 was built in 1960. Road tests of the car did not begin until 1962.

== Technical features ==
The Tipo 103 was built on a steel unibody chassis. The overall length was 3,630 mm (142.9 in), and the car weighed 725 kg (1,598 lb).

The body style was a four-door three-box berlina with a tall greenhouse. The rear deck lid had a wide shallow recess running fore-and-aft which continued in the front hood as an indented "V" carried through into the upper grille of the car. The taillights were set into indentations in the rear of the car on either side.

Suspension was independent front and rear with coil-over shock absorbers. Brakes were disk front and drum rear. An unusual feature of the rear suspension was that it was electrically adjustable. Extensive work was done on the type of constant-velocity joint used to provide predictable behaviour but even then Busso felt it was a temporary solution.

Power came from a version of the Alfa Romeo Twin Cam engine adapted for the 103. This inline four-cylinder DOHC engine has two valves per cylinder and an aluminum head and cylinder block with steel wet liners. In the Tipo 103 it displaced 896 cc (54.7 cu in) with a bore of 66 mm and a stroke of 65.5 mm. Maximum power was 52 PS (38 kW; 51 hp) at 5500 rpm. In adapting the Nord engine to a transverse application the engine block and transaxle cases were built as one unit. Power was transmitted to the front wheels through a four-speed fully synchronized manual gearbox. The top speed during testing was 139 km/h (86.4 mph) and the standing kilometer took 41.2 seconds.

== Post-cancellation ==
Alfa Romeo did not put the Tipo 103 into production. At the time Alfa was building Renaults for the entry-level market, which freed them to focus on the more profitable middle- and upper-price market. It is speculated that Alfa's decision was also influenced by pressure from Fiat to honour a "gentleman's agreement" that Fiat would not build larger more expensive cars and Alfa would not intrude into the small car market that Fiat was active in.

Styling cues from the body of the 103 would appear in other later Alfa Romeos, including the Giulia, which came to market in 1962.

It is widely believed that the Tipo 103 influenced the design of the Renault 8 that was introduced in 1962 with a Vee hood and boxy shape but with a rear-mounted engine.

Alfa Romeo revisited the concept of a compact front wheel drive car a decade later with the government-backed Alfasud.

The Tipo 103 prototype and three engines are preserved at the Alfa Romeo Museum in Arese.
