= Alfa Romeo Gran Sport Quattroruote =

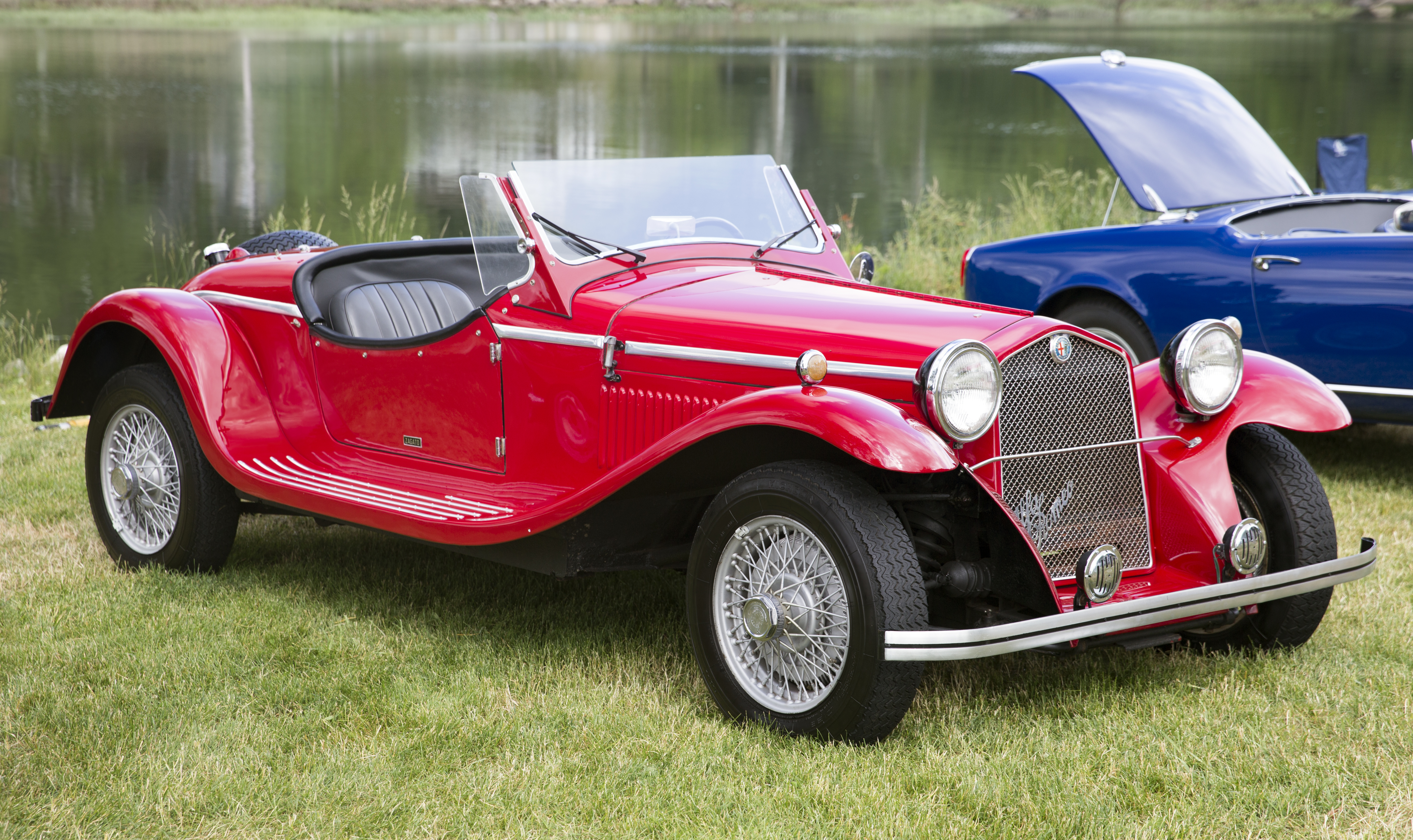

Overview
- Manufacturer: Alfa Romeo
- Production: 1965–1967
- Assembly: Zagato
- Designer: Ercole Spada at Zagato

Body and chassis
- Class: Sports car
- Body style: roadster
- Layout: Front-engine, rear-wheel-drive
- Related: Alfa Romeo Giulia

Powertrain
- Engine: 1.6 L Twin Cam I4
- Transmission: 5-speed manual

Dimensions
- Wheelbase: 2,600 mm (102.4 in)
- Length: 3,670 mm (144.5 in)
- Width: 1,620 mm (63.8 in)
- Height: 1,430 mm (56.3 in)
- Kerb weight: 750 kg (1,653 lb)

The Alfa Romeo Gran Sport Quattroruote is a two-seater roadster made between 1965 and 1967 by Italian car manufacturer Alfa Romeo and the coachbuilder Zagato. The car wears retro bodywork by Zagato, replicating the Alfa Romeo 6C 1750 Gran Sport Spider Zagato of the early 1930s, over then-modern Alfa Romeo Giulia mechanicals. Just 92 were made.

== History ==
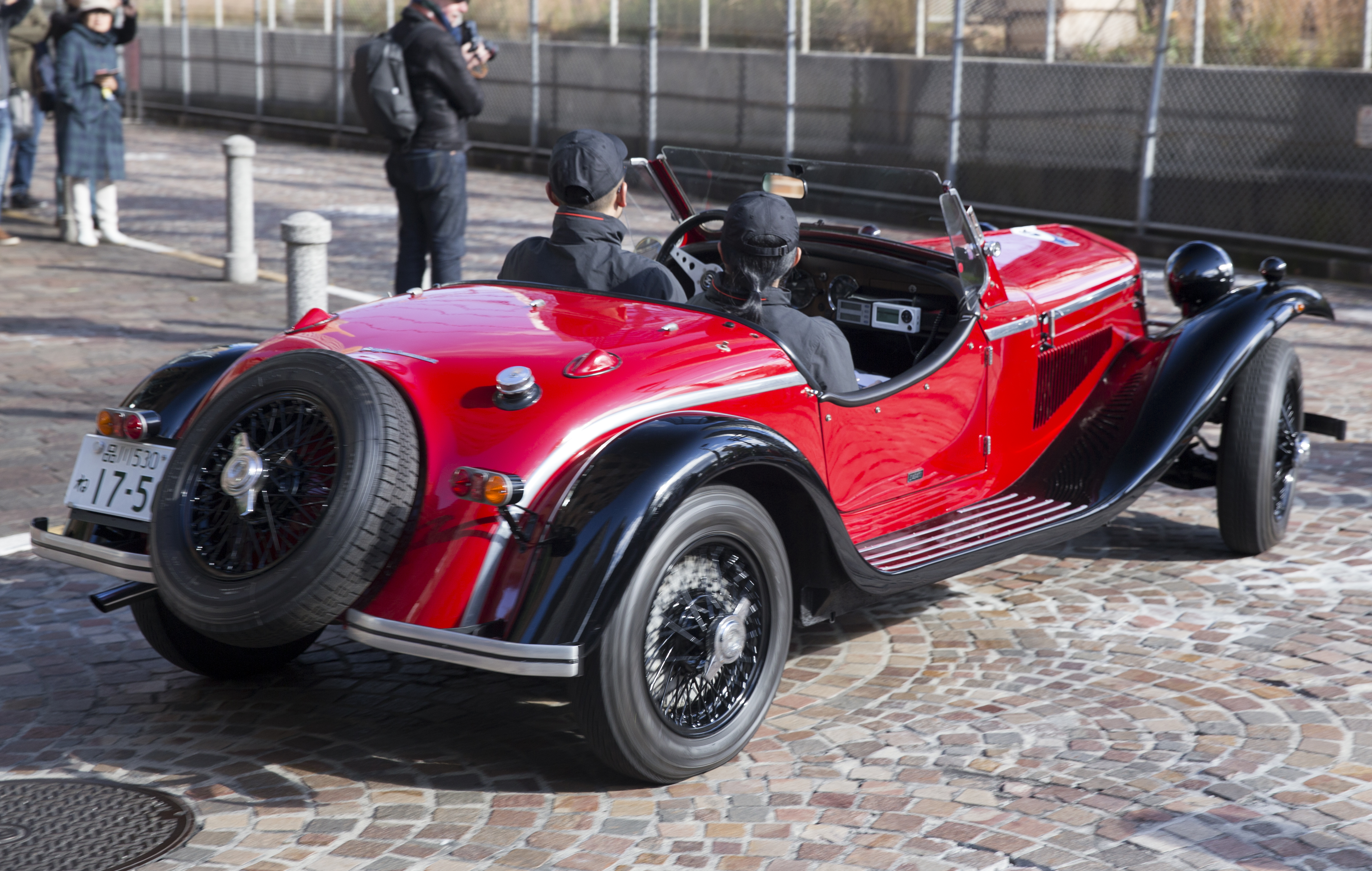
Rear view (1966)

The Gran Sport was inspired by an article published by Italian car magazine Quattroruote, and was built in collaboration with Milanese coachbuilder Zagato.

The first prototype was introduced in April 1965 at a coachbuilders' motor show at the Museo Nazionale dell'Automobile in Turin, while the first production version was unveiled a year later, at the New York Auto Show.

Alfa Romeo supplied a purpose-built bare chassis to Zagato, where the bodies were hand-built and the cars finished. Engine, gearbox and other mechanicals were from the 105-series Giulia TI. The vehicles were sold through Alfa Romeo's dealer network. Alfa Romeo produced 12 chassis in 1965, 52 in 1966, and 29 in 1967.

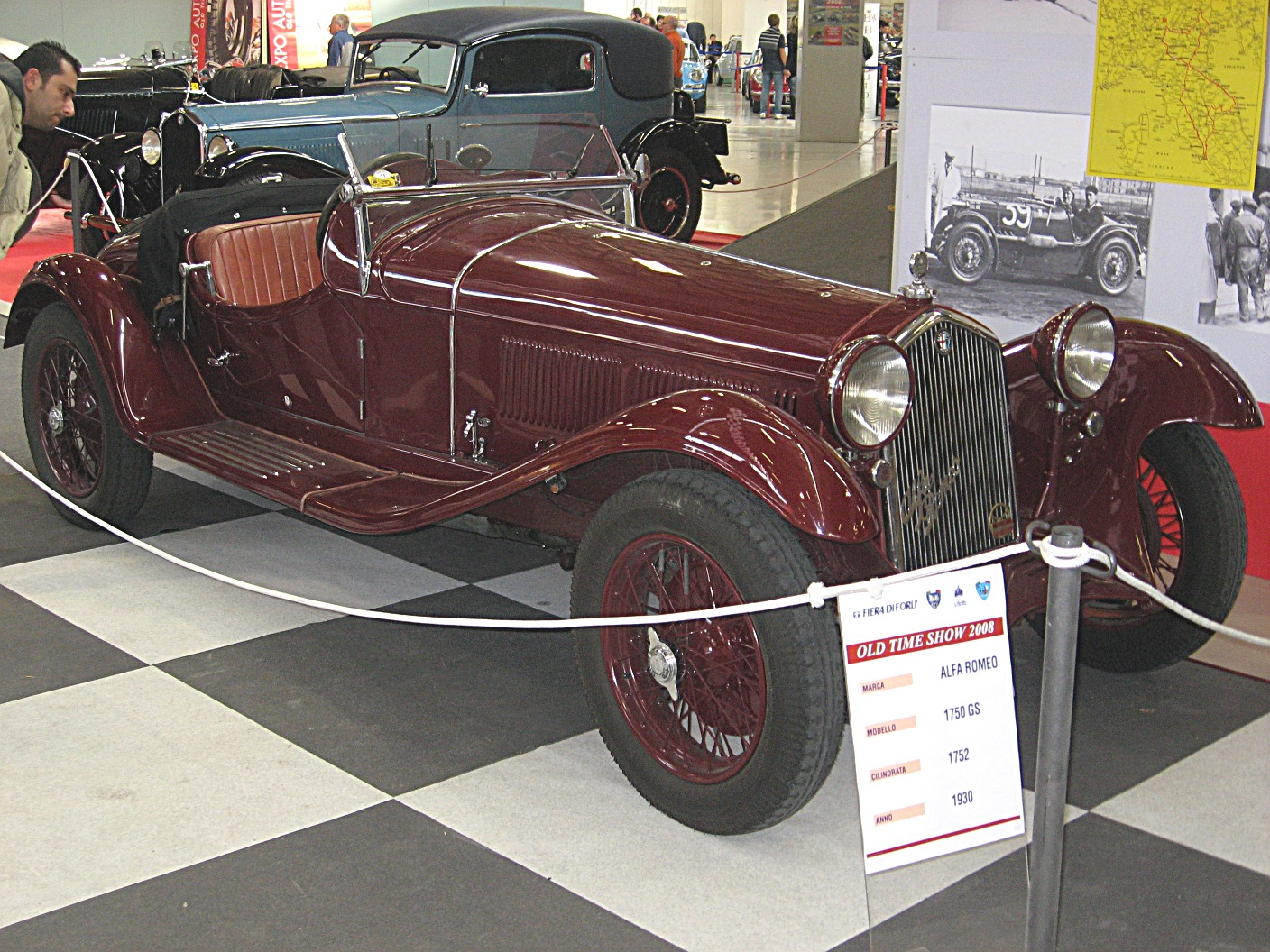
The inspiration for the Gran Sport Quattroruote, the 1930 6C1750 Gran Sport Spider Zagato

== Specifications ==
The 1,570 cc Alfa Romeo Twin Cam inline-four engine produced 92 PS DIN (68 kW; 91 bhp) at 6,000 rpm, for a top speed of 155 km/h (96 mph). Transmission, suspension and steering were all carried over from the Giulia: 5-speed gearbox, double wishbone suspension at the front and a solid axle at the rear, coil springs, and rack and pinion steering. On aesthetic grounds 15-inch knock-off wire wheels and drum brakes (front three-shoe and rear two-shoe) were fitted instead of the Giulia's steel wheels and four wheel disc brakes. The body was made of aluminium panels over a tubular framework, after Zagato's traditional construction method. The car was available in two versions: "Normale" and "Extra". As a true roadster, the Gran Sport had removable side curtains and top. There was no boot lid, as a spare wheel was carried at the rear, and the luggage compartment was accessible from behind the seats.

== Bibliography ==
- Fusi, Luigi (1978). Alfa Romeo—Tutte le vetture dal 1910—All cars from 1910 (3rd ed.). Milan: Emmeti Grafica editrice.
