= Alfa Romeo Twin Cam engine =

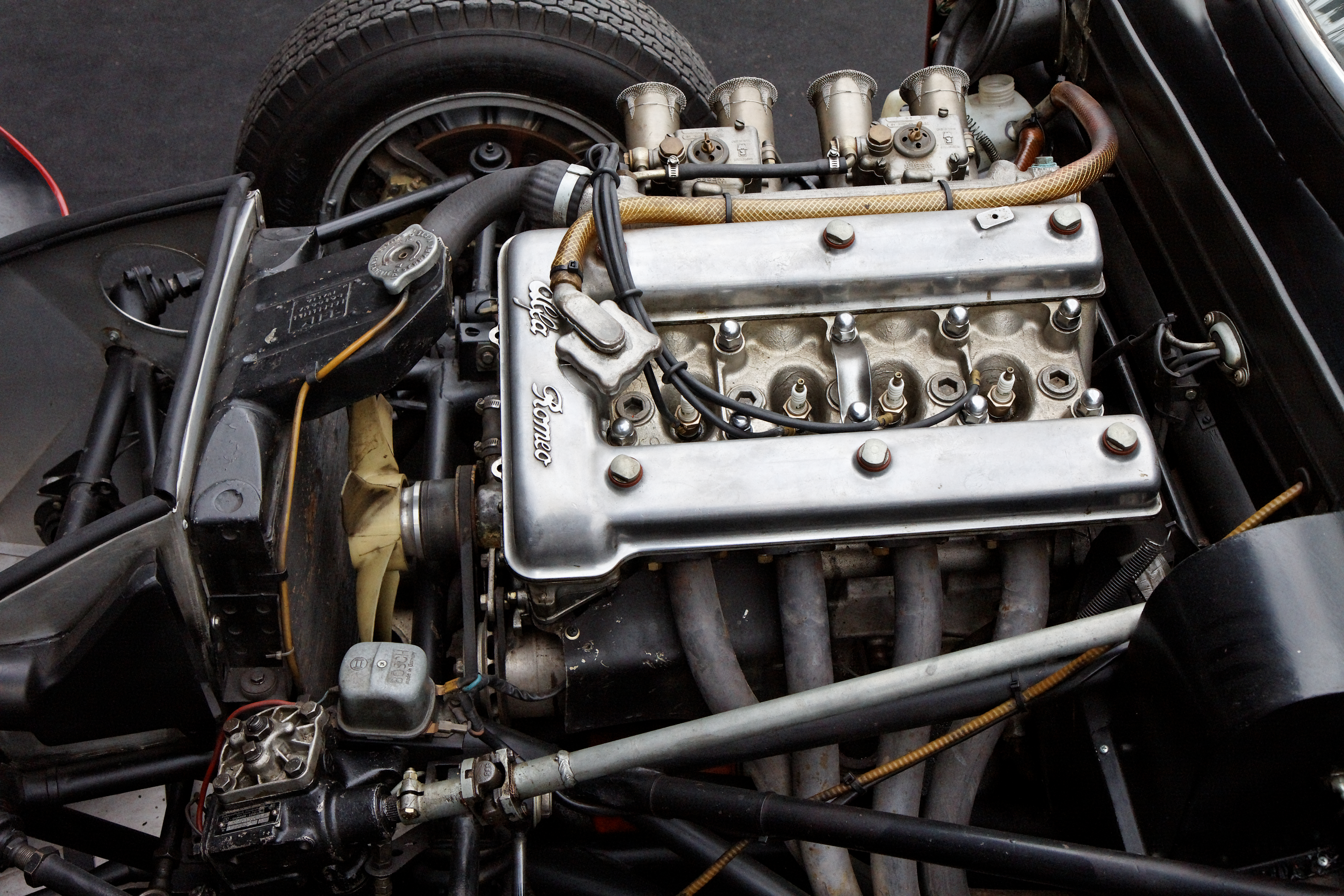

Overview
- Manufacturer: Alfa Romeo (1954–1986); Alfa Lancia Industriale (1987–1991); Fiat Auto (1991–1994)
- Designer: Giuseppe Busso
- Also called: Nord engine
- Production: 1954–1994

Layout
- Configuration: Inline-4 engine
- Displacement: 0.9 L; 54.7 cu in (896 cc); 1.3 L; 78.3 cu in (1,283 cc); 1.3 L; 78.7 cu in (1,290 cc); 1.4 L; 82.8 cu in (1,357 cc); 1.5 L; 90.9 cu in (1,489 cc); 1.6 L; 95.6 cu in (1,567 cc); 1.7 L; 106.7 cu in (1,749 cc); 1.8 L; 108.2 cu in (1,773 cc); 1.8 L; 108.6 cu in (1,779 cc); 2.0 L; 119.7 cu in (1,962 cc); 2.0 L; 121.7 cu in (1,995 cc); 2.1 L; 125.5 cu in (2,056 cc)
- Cylinder bore: 66 mm (2.60 in); 74 mm (2.91 in); 78 mm (3.07 in); 79.5 mm (3.13 in); 80 mm (3.15 in); 83.4 mm (3.28 in); 84 mm (3.31 in); 86 mm (3.39 in)
- Piston stroke: 57.9 mm (2.28 in); 65.5 mm (2.58 in); 67.5 mm (2.66 in); 75 mm (2.95 in); 80 mm (3.15 in); 82 mm (3.23 in); 88.5 mm (3.48 in)
- Cylinder block material: Aluminium
- Cylinder head material: Aluminium
- Valvetrain: DOHC 2 valves per cylinder (some racing heads had 4 valves per cylinder)

Combustion
- Turbocharger: Avio, KKK (some versions)
- Fuel system: Dual Dell'Orto DHLA40H pressurised carburetors, Electronic fuel injection
- Fuel type: Gasoline
- Oil system: Wet sump
- Cooling system: Water-cooled

Output
- Power output: From 52 to 300 bhp (39 to 224 kW; 53 to 304 PS)

Chronology
- Predecessor: Alfa Romeo 1900 I4
- Successor: Alfa Romeo Twin Spark

The Alfa Romeo Twin Cam engine is an all-alloy inline-four engine series produced by Alfa Romeo from 1954 to 1994. In Italian it is known as the "bialbero" ("twin-shaft"), and has also been nicknamed the "Nord" (North) engine in reference to its being built in Portello, Milan (later Arese, close to Milan), in the North of Italy and to distinguish it from the Alfa Romeo Boxer engine built in the South (Sud) for the Alfasud.

== History ==
The Twin Cam's predecessor appeared in the 1950 Alfa Romeo 1900 and was an under-square inline four cylinder with a cast-iron block, an aluminium alloy crossflow cylinder head with double overhead cams and a 90° included angle between intake and exhaust valves. Development of that engine was overseen by Orazio Satta Puliga who would also helm development of its successor. The 1952 Disco Volante had a 2-litre DOHC four cylinder engine with an aluminium block and sleeves, but this seems to have been a custom version of the 1900 engine rather than a prototype of the forthcoming Twin Cam. While the Twin Cam shared some features with the 1900 engine, it was a new design by Giuseppe Busso.

The Alfa Romeo Twin Cam engine debuted in the 1954 Giulietta. The engine featured:

- An aluminium alloy engine block with cast iron "wet" cylinder liners
- An aluminium alloy cylinder head with hemispherical combustion chambers.
- A forged steel crankshaft running in five main bearings
- Double overhead camshafts driven by a double row timing chain
- Direct valve actuation via camshafts on bucket tappets
- Two inclined valves per cylinder with a near-centrally located spark plug
- Inlet and exhaust valves separated by an angle of 80 degrees
- A large, flat, finned oil sump.

These features made the Twin Cam an advanced design for a production car engine of the mid-1950s and would, with minor variations, form the basis of all future versions of the engine.

The engine displaced 1,290 cc (1.3 L) in the 1954 Giulietta. In 1960 another version of the Twin Cam was unveiled along with the Alfa Romeo Tipo 103 small car prototype. This version was noteworthy because, with a bore of 66 mm (2.60 in), a stroke of 65.5 mm (2.58 in) and displacing just 896 cc (0.9 L), it was the smallest four-cylinder Twin Cam ever. Power was 39 kW; 53 PS (52 bhp) at 5500 rpm. In adapting the engine to the transverse front-engine, front-wheel-drive layout the engine block and transaxle case were built as one unit. Only three of these engines were built.

On June 27, 1962, a larger Twin Cam appeared in the just-released Giulia. The obvious change was that displacement was increased to 1,567 cc (1.6 L), but the engine was also now being produced using a different casting method. The diameter of the valve stems had been increased by 1 to 9 mm (0.04 to 0.35 in), the bore centre spacing was different, the timing chain longer and the crankshaft had been revised, among other changes.

In 1968 the engine was again enlarged, this time to 1,779 cc (1.8 L), for the 1750 GTV and 1750 Berlina. Additional changes to this version included offsetting the big-end bearings on the connecting rods, and adding sodium-filled exhaust valves. In 1971 a 1,962 cc (2.0 L) version was introduced for the 2000 GTV and 2000 Berlina. This largest production Twin Cam also had fewer teeth in the ring-gear and 6 bolts holding the flywheel instead of 8.

When the engine was adapted for use in the Alfetta in 1972, this necessitated a new oil pump and a change away from the finned sump used in the 105-series cars. While this was an aesthetic loss it may have been beneficial in other ways, as some owners reported that the old sump kept the engine and oil so cool that in cold weather it was sometimes necessary to block off the radiator airflow to raise the coolant temperature enough for the interior heater to be effective. Since the Alfetta also used a rear-mounted transaxle, there was no need for a pilot bearing in the engine.

The Twin Cam was the first production automobile engine to employ a form of Variable Valve Timing (VVT). The system that appeared on the 1980 Spider was an electro-mechanical system employing a variator to alter the phase but not duration of the intake camshaft.

== Competition variations and specials ==
Alfa Romeo's Autodelta competition arm produced several variations on the Twin Cam for different racing classes and cars, including the racing oriented GTA. Displacements ranged from a 1,283 cc (1.3 L) over-square version with a bore and stroke of 84 mm × 57.9 mm (3.31 in × 2.28 in) up to a 2,056 cc (2.1 L) version with a bore and stroke of 86 mm × 88.5 mm (3.39 in × 3.48 in). Many of these engines used dual ignition systems (see "Twin Spark").

Even though Alfa Romeo never sold a production version of the Twin Cam with more than 8 valves, at least two 16 valve cylinder heads were available. A number of Autodelta engines had them, and another 16-valve head was developed by the tuner Franco Angelini.

Some Autodelta cylinder heads had an included angle between the intake and exhaust valves narrower than the 80° used in the majority of the production engines. These heads are called "testa stretta" (narrow head).

Some engines also had what was called a "monosleeve" liner, where all four cylinder bore liners are cast side-by-side in a single piece.

The 1959 Asardo 1500 AR-S was a one-off non-Alfa prototype that used a custom-built version of the Twin Cam. Starting with a 1,290 cc (1.3 L) block the bore was increased to 79.5 mm (3.13 in) by using custom pistons and wet liners from Mahle so that its final displacement was 1,489 cc (1.5 L; 90.9 cu in) and power was 135 bhp (137 PS; 101 kW).

== Forced-induction versions ==
In 1967 the Alfa Romeo GTA SA debuted at the Geneva Motor Show. Built by Autodelta, the 1,567 cc (1.6 L) Twin Cam engine was boosted by two superchargers driven by an engine-powered oil pump. Power was reported to be 220 bhp (223 PS; 164 kW).

In 1979 the Alfa Romeo GTV Turbodelta was released. The 2 litre engine was augmented by a KKK turbocharger blowing through a pair of Dell'Orto DHLA40H pressurised carburetors and produced 150 bhp (152 PS; 112 kW) in normal tune. This car was only offered until 1981 when Alfa Romeo left Group 4 to concentrate on Formula 1. 400 were built.

In 1984 Alfa released the Giulietta Turbodelta. Equipped with a 1,962 cc (2.0 L) Twin Cam, dual carburetors and an Alfa Avio turbocharger the engine produced 125 kW (170 PS; 168 bhp).

In 1986, a turbocharged version of the 1,779 cc (1.8 L) single-plug engine developing 167 PS (123 kW; 165 bhp) was used to create the Alfa Romeo 75 1.8 Turbo Quadrifoglio. In Group A touring car racing form this engine made up to 223.7 kW (300 bhp).

== Twin Spark ==
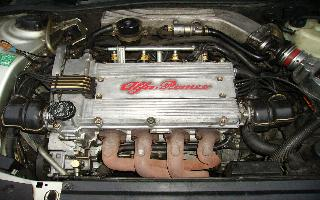
Alfa Romeo Twin Spark engine

Alfa Romeo's Twin Spark technology used dual ignition to fire two spark plugs in the cylinder head of each piston bore and was first used in the A.L.F.A. Grand Prix car of 1914. Racing versions of the Giulia engine, including the engine used in the GTA, featured a cylinder head with two spark plugs per cylinder. Twin Spark versions of the Twin Cam were also developed for 1750 and 2000 models used for racing.

In 1987 the production Alfa 75 2.0 Twin Spark was fitted with a Twin Spark head, which provided improved fuel ignition and allowed an improved combustion chamber shape with narrower angle between intake and exhaust valve. Although developed from the Twin Cam, few if any parts are interchangeable between Twin Spark engines and Twin Cams. For instance, while Twin Cams have six oilways leading to the cylinder head the Twin Sparks only have two, the timing chain cover is narrowed and the included angle between the valves is down to 46°. The Twin Spark engine in the 75 also employed Alfa's variatore di fase VVT system which, when combined with electronic fuel injection, gave a power output of 148 PS (109 kW; 146 bhp).

The last examples of the Alfa Twin Cam were the 1,749 cc (1.7 L), 1,773 cc (1.8 L) and 1,995 cc (2.0 L) 8V Twin Spark engines featured in the 155 and 164. After 1995 the 155 featured the 16-valve Twin Spark which, although sharing features with the previous engine, is a different design that is a member of Fiat's "Pratola Serra" engine series, while the 164 continued with the 8-valve Twin Spark until the end of production in 1997.

The production of the Alfa Romeo Twin Cam ended in 1997, by which time it had been gradually replaced since 1995 by the newer Fiat-based 16-valve Twin Spark engines.

== Production sizes and applications ==
Year	Bore	Stroke	Displacement	Notes	Models
1954	74 mm (2.91 in)	75 mm (2.95 in)	1,290 cc (1.3 L; 78.7 cu in)		Giulietta, Romeo, Giulia, GT 1300 Junior, Spider 1300 Junior, Junior Z
1962	78 mm (3.07 in)	82 mm (3.23 in)	1,567 cc (1.6 L; 95.6 cu in)		Giulia, Giulia TZ, Gran Sport Quattroruote, Alfetta, Alfetta GT, Spider, 1600 Junior Z, Giulietta (116), 75
1968	80 mm (3.15 in)	88.5 mm (3.48 in)	1,779 cc (1.8 L; 108.6 cu in)		1750 Berlina, 1750 GTV, Alfetta, Alfetta GT, 1750 Spider Veloce, 90, Giulietta (116), 75
1970	84 mm (3.31 in)	88.5 mm (3.48 in)	1,962 cc (2.0 L; 119.7 cu in)		2000 Berlina, 2000 GTV, Alfetta, Alfetta GTV, Spider, 90, Giulietta (116), 75
1977	80 mm (3.15 in)	67.5 mm (2.66 in)	1,357 cc (1.4 L; 82.8 cu in)		Giulietta (116)
1986	80 mm (3.15 in)	88.5 mm (3.48 in)	1,779 cc (1.8 L; 108.6 cu in)	Turbocharged	75
1987	84 mm (3.31 in)	88.5 mm (3.48 in)	1,962 cc (2.0 L; 119.7 cu in)	Twin Spark, VVT	75, 164
1992	84 mm (3.31 in)	80 mm (3.15 in)	1,773 cc (1.8 L; 108.2 cu in)	Twin Spark, VVT	155
1992	84 mm (3.31 in)	90 mm (3.54 in)	1,995 cc (2.0 L; 121.7 cu in)	Twin Spark, VVT	164, 155
1993	83.4 mm (3.28 in)	80 mm (3.15 in)	1,749 cc (1.7 L; 106.7 cu in)	Twin Spark	155

== See also ==
- Alfa Romeo V6 engine
- Fiat Twin Cam engine
