= The Slant (band) =

US musical group

The Slant was an American experimental, psychedelic, indie, alternative, folk/rock music group based in Pittsburgh, Pennsylvania. The group has received favorable reviews from National Public Radio and various other media outlets. The Slant used traditional and non-traditional instruments, as well as various sounds produced by objects not typically classified as musical instruments. These sounds can include desks, doors, suitcases, drawers, nails on chalkboard, cigarboxes, pages fluttering, TV static, forks, hammering of nails, amp pops, firebells, vacuum cleaners, and stairwells.

== History ==
The band had five members - Brad Austin, Zach Dow, Adam Dow, and Mark Zedonek of Coudersport, Pennsylvania, and André Costello of Ellwood City, Pennsylvania. Formed in 2007, the group has performed in and throughout the eastern United States. Live shows were energetic and featured variations of recorded material and an occasional joke or two.

After being featured on National Public Radio, the group recorded The Makings of This House (released in 2009) and has performed with artists and groups including Blind Pilot, Nicholas Megalis, Paleface, Megafaun, Sybris, and many others. The Slant performed annually at the Austin Dam Show: a grassroots folk festival held in Austin, Pennsylvania at the site of the historic Austin Dam tragedy. Additionally, the group has worked with Advanced Alternative Media with The Makings of This House, reaching new college-age fans across the United States.

On 14 June 2010, the band disbanded due to lack of collective cooperation and creative tension amongst members. They played their final show in Coudersport, Pennsylvania on 17 July 2010.

== Members ==
- Mark Zedonek
- Zach Dow
- Brad Austin
- André Costello
- Adam Dow

== Discography ==
- Animanatomy (2007)
- Old North (2008)
- The Makings of This House (2009)
