= Per Gillbrand =

Swedish engineer (1934–2016)

- Born: 23 March 1934; Tidaholm, Sweden
- Died: 30 November 2016 (aged 82); Mariefred
- Other names: Turbo-Pelle; Mr. Turbo
- Occupation: Mechanical engineer

Per Sune Evaldsson Gillbrand (23 March 1934 – 30 November 2016) was a Swedish automobile engineer. Born in Tidaholm, Gillbrand is best known for his contribution to the development of several engines for Saab, and in particular their turbocharged engines.

== Career ==
After graduating from the Tekniska gymnasiet i Göteborg (Technical High School of Gothenburg), Gillbrand started working for Volvo in 1956, initially as a test engineer in Skövde and later as an engine development engineer in Gothenburg.

Saab, Sweden's other major car manufacturer, was in need of 4-stroke engine expertise as they phased out the 2-stroke engines used in their earliest models. They recruited Gillbrand, along with Olle Granlund, another colleague from Volvo, in 1964.

Gillbrand's first assignment for Saab was the final test of the Ford Taunus V4 engine in the Saab 96. He was then involved in adapting the Triumph slant-four engine for the Saab 99. This engine was later replaced by the Saab B engine, an updated version of the Triumph unit manufactured at Saab-Scania in Södertälje.

In 1970 Gillbrand became manager of Saab-Scania's engine laboratory in Södertälje, where he was in charge when Saab became the first car manufacturer to use small turbochargers in gasoline engines, along with technologies such as the wastegate found in most modern turbocharged engines today. For his work on forced induction engines, Gillbrand earned the nickname Turbopelle (Turbo-Geek).

== Inventions ==
Gillbrand is the inventor of the Automatic Performance Control system.

Another of Gillbrand's inventions is the Electronically Controlled Variable Compression engine that he built in the late 1990s. Later renamed the Saab Variable Compression engine (SVC), it was presented at the 2000 Geneva Motor Show. General Motors (GM), Saab's owner at the time, did not approve further development of the SVC engine. This technology is today in development by car manufacturers such as Nissan, Infiniti and Porsche more than 20 years after Gillbrand originated the idea.

== Honours ==
Gillbrand was awarded a Gold Medal from the Swedish Royal Academy of Sciences for his research work in 1988, and in 1992 he received the title of Honorary Doctor of Technology from Chalmers University in Gothenburg.

In 2006 he was made an honorary member of the Svenska Volvo P1800-klubben (Volvo P1800 Club of Sweden) for his contributions to development of the Volvo B18 engine.

In 2023, Gillbrand was posthumously awarded the international motororganization Fédération Internationale des Véhicules Anciens (FIVA) Heritage Hall of Fame. The motivation for the awarded was his pioneering contribution to the world of automobiles, especially the work at Saab with the turbocharged engines.
