= Saab B engine =

B engine
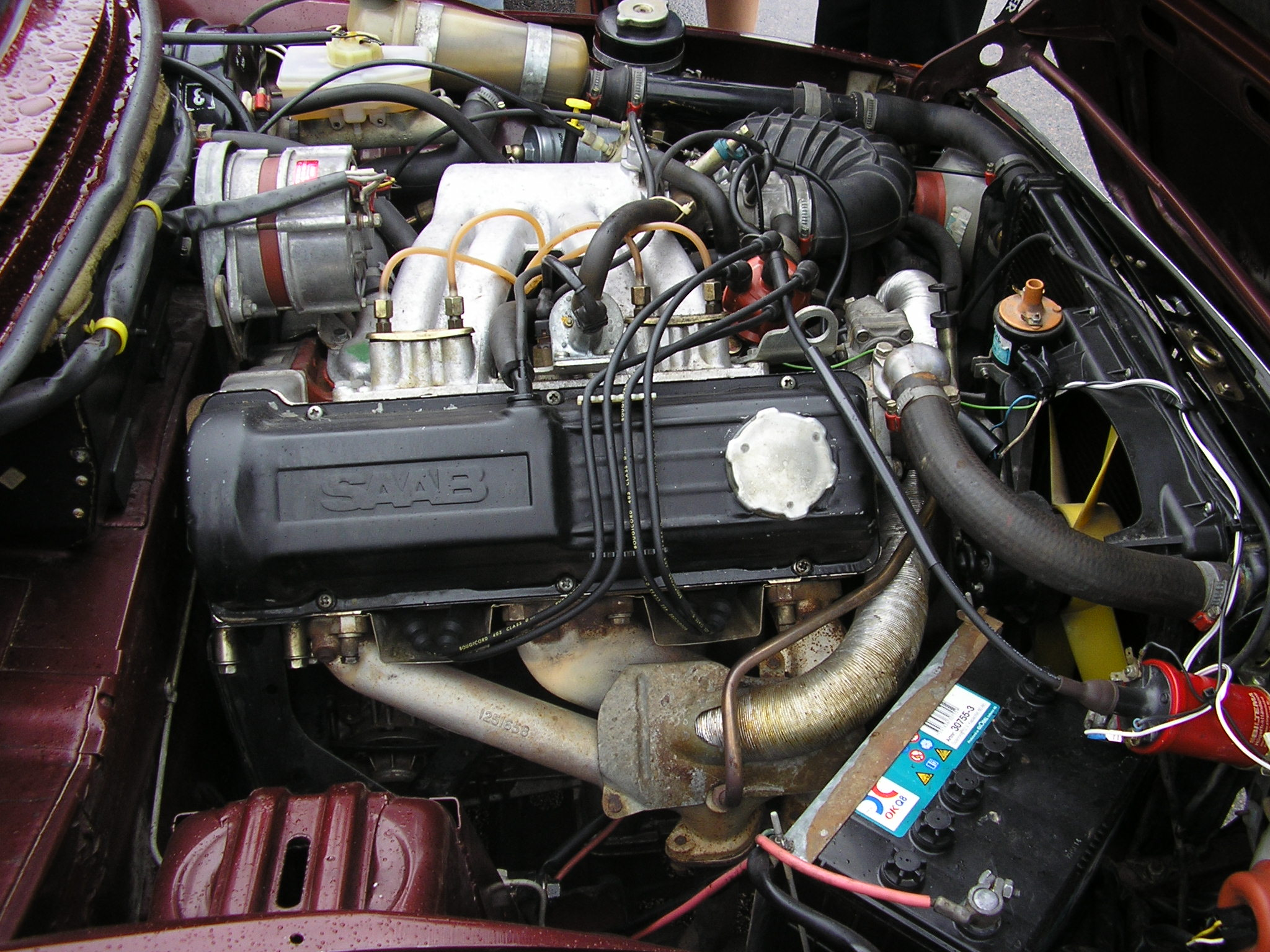

Overview
- Manufacturer: Saab Automobile
- Production: 1972-1981

Layout
- Configuration: Inline-4
- Displacement: 2.0 L; 121.1 cu in (1,985 cc)
- Cylinder bore: 90 mm (3.54 in)
- Piston stroke: 78 mm (3.07 in)
- Cylinder block material: Cast iron
- Cylinder head material: Aluminium
- Valvetrain: SOHC
- Compression ratio: 7.2:1, 7.5:1, 8.7:1, 9.0:1, 9.2:1, 9.5:1

Combustion
- Turbocharger: Single Garrett AiResearch T3 (99 Turbo)
- Fuel system: Zenith-Stromberg carburettors Mechanical fuel injection
- Management: Bosch D-Jetronic
- Fuel type: Petrol
- Oil system: Wet sump
- Cooling system: Water-cooled

Output
- Power output: 85–220 hp (63.4–164.1 kW)
- Torque output: 157–174 lb⋅ft (213–236 N⋅m)

Emissions
- Emissions control systems: Catalytic converter

Chronology
- Predecessor: Triumph slant-four engine
- Successor: Saab H engine

The Saab B engine is an inline four-cylinder car petrol engine developed by Saab Automobile. A redesign of the Triumph slant-four engine, the B engine displaced 2.0 L and first appeared in 1972. The B engine was used in the Saab 99 and 900 models. Saab began to phase the engine out in 1981.

== History ==
In the early 1960s Rolf Mellde, Per Gillbrand and Karl Rosenqvist began work on a new 1.2 L inline four for the upcoming Saab 99. UK engineering and consultancy company Ricardo was involved in the project, and were also aware that Triumph in the UK were working on a similar engine. When Saab determined that developing their own engine would be too expensive and too risky, Ricardo put Saab in contact with Triumph.

Triumph agreed to supply Saab with 50,000 engines for the new 99. Displacement was 1.71 L at first, and was increased to 1.85 L later. Saab had exclusive use of the slant-four for the first several years of production. Saab designed a new transaxle which utilized the case of the transaxle as its oil sump. The Triumph engine was turned 180° so that the clutch and flywheel were in the front. A consequence of this is that the "front"-mounted water pump would be facing the firewall/bulkhead and be inaccessible, prompting it to be relocated to the top of the cylinder block.

In 1972 Saab brought production of the engine in-house to their Scania division at a facility in Södertälje. An uncorroborated letter to the editor references a Saab press release of July 1970 that indicates that this was planned from the outset. Saab then embarked on a redesign of the engine that resulted in the Saab B engine. Displacement increased to 2.0 L, but the bore diameter was 0.3 mm (0.012 in) smaller than the corresponding 2.0 L Triumph version.

Saab redesigned the engine again in 1981, creating the Saab H engine.

== Technical features ==
While the B engine carried features like bore centers and bearings over from the original Triumph design, it was a substantial redesign. Like the Triumph slant-four it was developed from, the B engine's block is made of cast iron, and the cylinders are canted over at 45° from vertical. The 78 mm (3.07 in) stroke of the earlier engine was retained, but the bore was increased to 90 mm (3.54 in). Other changes from the Triumph slant-four included a new cylinder head with bigger valves, enlarged ports, a new combustion chamber shape, and a camshaft assembly redesigned for better lubrication. Intake systems for the Saab 99 had included fuel injected versions from as early as the 1970 model year, and this continued with the B engine, along with both single- and dual-carburettor setups.

The compression ratio in the earliest B engines was reduced to 8.7:1 from the 9.0:1 of the Triumph engine, but power reportedly increased. The redesign kept the unusual waterpump arrangement, which consisted of a cast aperture in the block, and the pump shaft with bearing, seals and impeller pressed into the aperture, but improved the design of the seal. The pump is driven by a jackshaft and helical gear. Later B engines used a fine tooth gear which is easily damaged and is a weak link in an otherwise very reliable engine. The early B engine was one of two (the other being the Honda CVCC) that were able to meet the stringent emission requirements set by the state of California for 1975 without resorting to a catalytic converter.

== 16-valve ==
In the mid-1970s Swedish engineer Gunnar Axelsson developed a DOHC cylinder head with 16 valves for the B engine block. Power output was estimated to be 220 hp (164.1 kW). The engine was briefly used in Saab's rally cars.

== Turbo ==
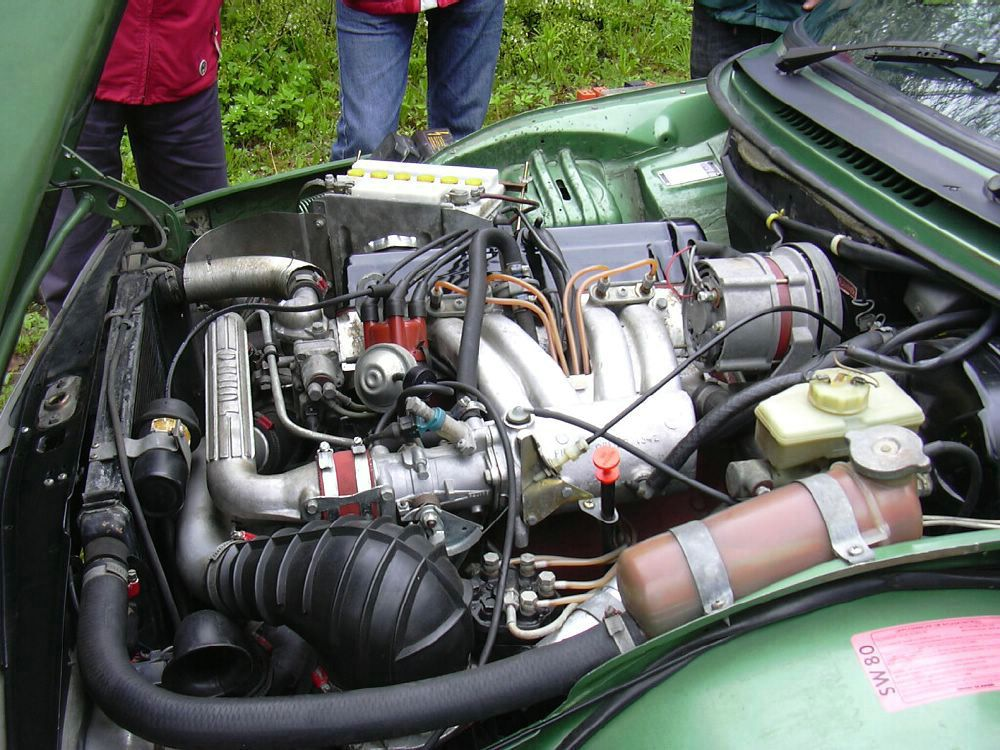
B engine in a 1980 Saab 99 Turbo

In 1978 Saab introduced a turbocharged version of the B engine in the 99 Turbo model. A key member of the team that developed the Turbo engine was Per Gillbrand, who earned the nicknames Turbo-pelle (Turbo-Pete) in Swedish and Mr. Turbo in English for his work with forced induction. Mellde was also on the development team, and he and Gillbrand were also joined by Bengt Gadfelt, who came to them from Scania where he worked on turbocharging Saab-Scania trucks, and Englishman Geoffrey Kershaw, who had apprenticed at Rolls-Royce and would go on to found Turbo-Technics Ltd.

Saab's emphasis was on torque, rather than maximum power. The turbocharged B engine was distinguished from earlier turbo engines by its use of a small, low-mass impeller able to spin up quickly, and the pioneering use of a wastegate to control boost pressure. A feature unique to the early Turbo engine was Saab's use of the exhaust manifold pressure to modulate the wastegate, allowing boost to decrease slowly at high engine speeds. This resulted in a broad, usable torque curve. Power was up 23% over the naturally aspirated version, while torque rose 45%.

Changes to the turbocharged B engine included reducing the compression ratio to 7.5:1 with special pistons, and adding sodium-filled exhaust valves, a revised camshaft, an oil cooler and a Garrett AiResearch T3 turbocharger with oil-cooled bearings and the above-mentioned external wastegate.

The turbocharged B engine was used in both the 99 and early 900 models.

== Dual-fuel ==
An alternative-fuel version of the Saab 99 GL called the Petro was developed by the joint venture Saab-Valmet and built at the Valmet factory in Uusikaupunki. This model had dual fuel tanks - one for gasoline and one for either kerosene (sold as "petroli" in Finland) or turpentine, the latter being produced from paper-mill byproducts in Finland, the only market where the car was sold. The engine was started on gasoline, then automatically switched to the other fuel, although the driver could select gasoline only with a manual override switch. Low-compression pistons from the Turbo were used in this version of the engine, as was the electronic ignition. The Petro first appeared in 1980. Running on 67 octane kerosene the engine produced 85 hp (63.4 kW) at 5600 rpm. 3,756 Saab 99 GL Petros were built.

== B engine variants ==
Compression ratio	Induction	Power output	Torque	Years
8.7:1, 9.2:1, 9.5:1	Zenith-Stromberg 175 CD single carburettor	95–100 hp (70.8–74.6 kW) @ 5200 rpm	157–162 N⋅m (116–119 lb⋅ft) @ 3500 rpm	1972–1981
9.2:1	Zenith-Stromberg 150 CD-25 dual carburettors	108 hp (80.5 kW) @ 5200 rpm	164 N⋅m (121 lb⋅ft) @ 3300 rpm	1976–1980
8.7:1, 9.2:1	Bosch D-Jetronic; Bosch CI mechanical FI	110 hp (82.0 kW) @ 5500 rpm 118 hp (88.0 kW) @ 5000 rpm	167 N⋅m (123 lb⋅ft) @ 3700 rpm	1972–1974 1975-1981
7.2:1	Turbocharged, Bosch CI mechanical FI	145 hp (108.1 kW) @ 5000 rpm	236 N⋅m (174 lb⋅ft) @ 3000 rpm	1977–1980

== Motorsports ==
Driver Stig Blomqvist won the 1976 Belgian Rally Boucles de Spa in a specially prepared 16-valve Saab 99. He then won the Swedish Rally in 1977 in a B engine-powered 99 EMS, and again in 1979 in a Turbo 99. The 1979 victory marked the first time a turbocharged car had won the Swedish Rally. In 1980 Saab withdrew from rally competition.

B-powered 99s were also successfully campaigned in various SCCA classes.
