= Triumph slant-four engine =

Inline four-cylinder petrol car engine

Triumph Slant-four engine
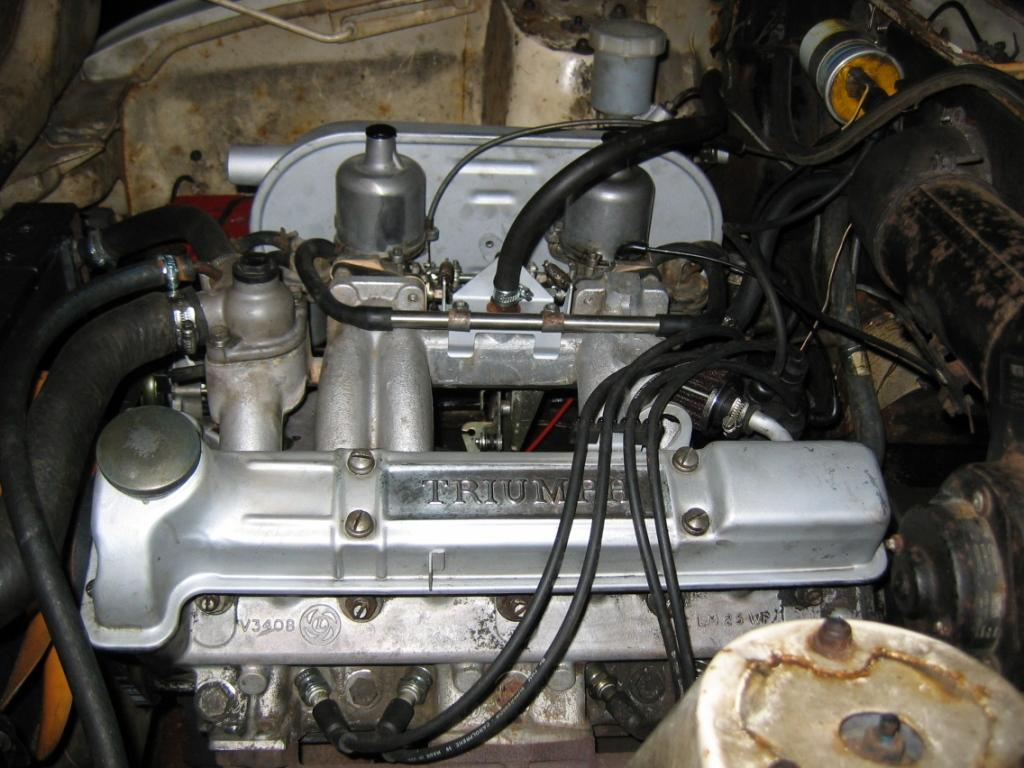

Overview
- Manufacturer: Triumph Motor Company
- Production: 1968 - 1981

Layout
- Configuration: I4
- Displacement: 1,709 cc (104.3 cu in); 1,854 cc (113.1 cu in); 1,985 cc (121.1 cu in); 1,998 cc (121.9 cu in)
- Cylinder block material: Cast iron
- Cylinder head material: Aluminium
- Valvetrain: SOHC

Combustion
- Fuel system: Carburettors
- Fuel type: Petrol
- Oil system: Wet sump
- Cooling system: Water-cooled

The Triumph slant-four is an inline four-cylinder petrol car engine developed by the Triumph Motor Company. It first appeared in 1968 in the Saab 99. The first Triumph model to use the engine did not appear until 1972. With an original capacity of 1.7 L, displacement grew over time to 2.0 L. Triumph production ended in 1981.

== History ==
In 1963 Triumph's Chief Engine Designer Lewis Dawtrey presented the results of his analysis of future engine technology trends and Triumph's anticipated needs. After evaluating rotary, horizontally opposed, V4 and V6 configurations Dawtrey recommended an OHC engine family composed of both Inline-4 and V8 engines that could be built with the same tooling. The new range would be built in capacities of 1.5 L to 3.0 L, allowing it to replace both the four-cylinder Standard SC and derivative Triumph I6 engines whose roots reached back to the Standard Eight of 1953. The recommendation was accepted and development began in-house at Triumph by a design team led by Dawtrey and Harry Webster. The initial model was to be a 1.5 L inline four.

At about the same time Saab was working on designing and building 55 hp 1.2-litre and 68 hp 1.5-litre prototype inline four engines for their upcoming 99 model. UK engineering and consultancy company Ricardo was involved in the Saab project and, while not directly involved in development of the slant-four, did have a general engine-development contract with Triumph and was aware of their progress. When Saab determined that developing their own engine would be too expensive and too risky, Ricardo put Saab into contact with Triumph.

Triumph agreed to supply Saab with 50,000 slant-four engines per year for the new 99. Displacement had risen from 1.5 L to 1.7 L. Saab had exclusive use of the slant-four for the first several years of production. Saab retained its existing transaxle, which was configured to be driven from the front of the engine. This required that the slant-four be turned 180° so that the clutch and flywheel were in the front. A consequence of this is that the "front"-mounted water pump would be facing the firewall/bulkhead and be inaccessible, prompting it to be relocated to the top of the cylinder block.

The engine was used first by Triumph in the Dolomite 1850, which appeared in 1972. The regular Dolomite used the 1.85 L engine, while the sportier Dolomite Sprint, unveiled in June 1973, got both a new cylinder head and an increase in displacement to 2.0 L. The slant-four was also used by Panther in the Dolomite-based Rio (1975–1977). The TR7 debuted in 1975 with the 2.0 L engine and 8-valve cylinder head. A few pre-production TR7 Sprint models received the sportier Sprint engine in 1977. Triumph stopped producing the slant-four when the TR7 was discontinued in 1981.

The V8 member of the engine family first appeared in a Triumph vehicle in 1970, fully two years before the slant-four. Development of the V8 had continued throughout the mid- to late-1960s, with early engines displacing 2.5 L. When Charles Spencer (Spen) King took over as Head of Engineering from Webster, he authorized continued development of the Triumph V8, and was also instrumental in getting the car it powered, the Triumph Stag, into production. The production V8 displaced 3.0 L.

== Technical features ==
The slant-four's engine block is of cast iron (called chrome iron in some references). The cylinders are inclined at an angle of 45° from vertical. This allowed the engine to be built with the same tooling needed for a V8, and reduced the overall engine height, permitting lower bonnets. The crankshaft ran in five main bearings. The pistons are aluminium with three rings. All slant-fours are oversquare, with the larger capacity versions being even more so, as the increase in displacement came from increasing the bore diameter while holding the stroke length constant.

The cylinder head was cast from aluminium alloy. Combustion chambers were wedge-shaped. The single overhead camshaft was driven by a single-row 3/8 in (9.5 mm) chain. The eight valves, two per cylinder, were inline and were operated on by the camshaft through bucket tappets with shims for adjustment.

== Sprint 16-valve engine ==
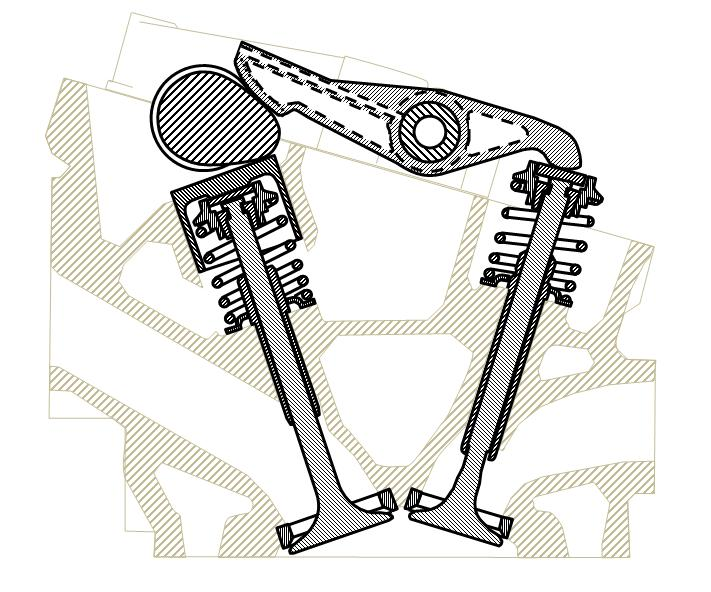
Cross-section of Dolomite Sprint cylinder head, highlighting the single cam operating both inlet and exhaust.

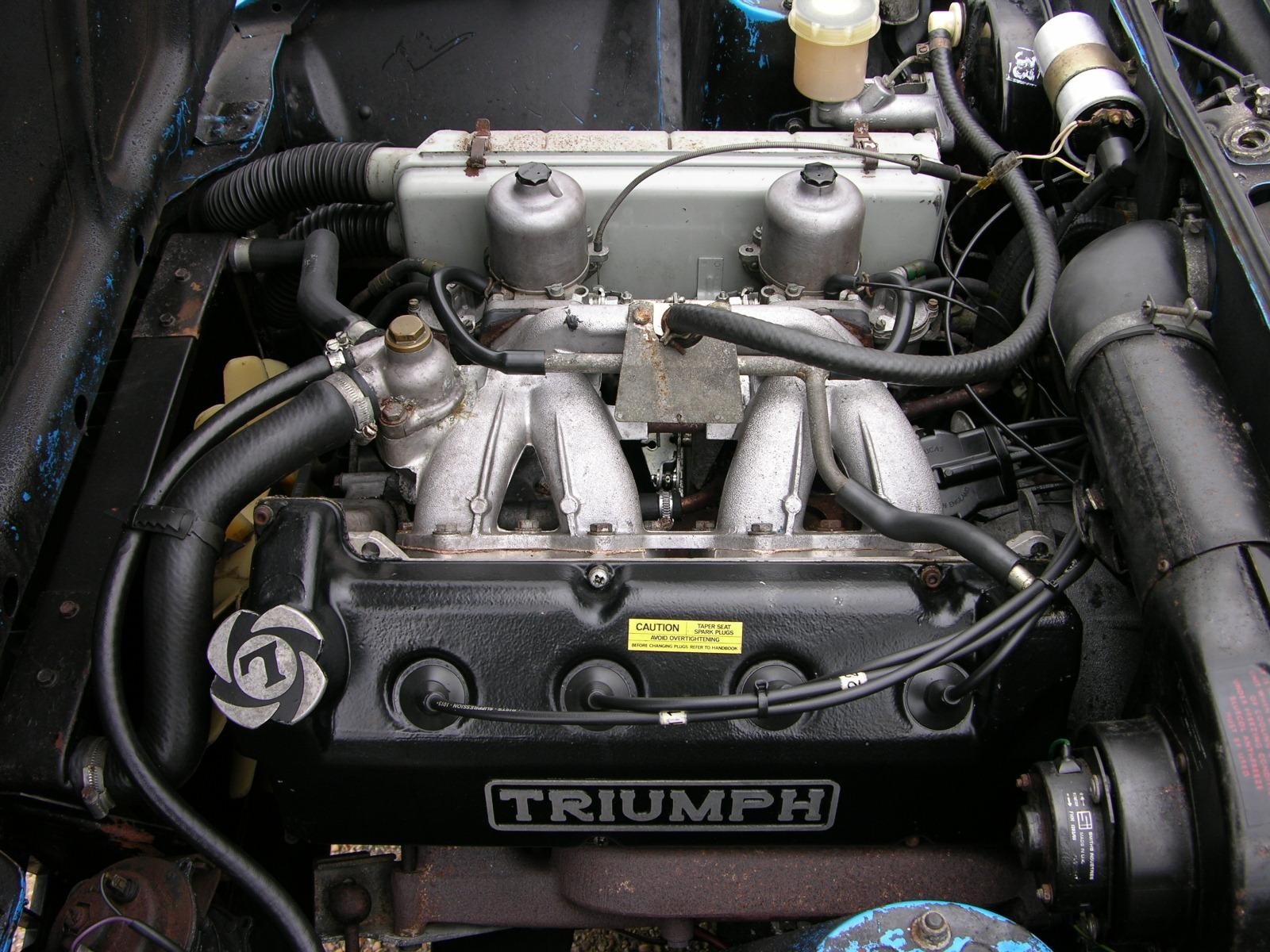
Triumph Dolomite Sprint engine

Triumph added a unique 16-valve cylinder head to the slant-four for the 1973 Dolomite Sprint. At the time there were at British Leyland (BL) both Harry Mundy, who worked on engine development at Jaguar, and Walter Hassan, also at Jaguar but in charge of engine technology development at BL as well. These two shared data on four-valve cylinder heads with King.

A team of engineers led by King and "with co-operation from Harry Mundy and the engineers at Coventry Climax", developed a 4-valve-per-cylinder head where all of the valves are actuated by a single camshaft rather than the more conventional DOHC arrangement. The valves are arranged in two rows of eight, inclined 27° from vertical. The inlet valves are 1.38 in (35.05 mm) in diameter and are operated by the camshaft lobes through bucket tappets, while the exhaust valves are 1.21 in (30.73 mm) in diameter and are operated through rocker arms. The design of the cylinder head won a British Design Council award in 1974.

Capacity was increased to 1,998 cc (122 cu in), and larger HS6 SU carburettors were fitted. Other changes to the Sprint engine included a duplex timing chain and alloy timing cover. The big-end journals were also cross-drilled.

The engine was expected to make 135 bhp, and King returned from holiday "to find an engine running on the bed giving 150 bhp at the first build." Hence, it was initially intended to be named the 'Dolomite 135'. This was changed to 'Dolomite Sprint' and published reasons vary. One oft-repeated rumour is that production lines could not guarantee 135 bhp. However, according to Matthew Vale, it was during development that Triumph switched to measuring power from imperial (SAE) to metric (DIN), which calculated outputs approximately 5% lower. In this case 135 bhp SAE is 127 bhp DIN.

The Dolomite Sprint has been described as "the world's first mass-produced multi-valve car". Multi-valve engines had first appeared in 1912, with the most recent prior to the release of the Sprint engine being the Cosworth BDA and Nissan S20 (1969) and Lotus 907 (1972), but they had not been used in mass-production vehicles until after the introduction of the Dolomite Sprint.

The 16-valve 2.0 L engine was also used in a small number of prototype and pre-production TR7 Sprints built at Triumph's plant in Speke during 1977.

== Saab B engine ==
In 1972 Saab brought production of the 1.85 L slant-four in-house to their Scania division at a facility in Södertälje. An uncorroborated letter to the editor of Motor Sport magazine references a Saab press release of July 1970 that indicates that this was planned from the outset. Following the transfer Saab embarked on a redesign of the engine that resulted in the Saab B engine. Displacement increased to 2.0 L, but the bore diameter was 0.3 mm (0.012 in) smaller than the enlarged Triumph version, resulting in a swept volume of 1,985 cc (121.1 cu in).

Saab's B engine shared much with the original Triumph design, including bore centres and bearings, but some previously problematic features, such as the water-pump and its seal, were redesigned.

== Slant-four variants ==
Displacement	Bore	Stroke	Compression ratio	Induction	Power	Torque	Year(s)	Notes
1,709 cc (104.3 cu in)	83.5 mm (3.3 in)	78 mm (3.1 in)	8.8:1	1x Zenith-Stromberg 175 CD	80 hp (59.7 kW) at 5200 rpm	94 ft⋅lb (127.4 N⋅m) at 3000 rpm	1969–1971	Saab 99 - single carb
1,709 cc (104.3 cu in)	83.5 mm (3.3 in)	78 mm (3.1 in)	9.0:1	Bosch D-Jetronic	87 hp (64.9 kW) at 5200 rpm	129 ft⋅lb (174.9 N⋅m) at 3000 rpm	1970	Fuel-injected Saab 99 1.7 L
1,854 cc (113.1 cu in)	87 mm (3.4 in)	78 mm (3.1 in)	9.0:1	2x SU HS4	92 hp (68.6 kW) at 5200 rpm	108 ft⋅lb (146.4 N⋅m) at 3500 rpm	1972 - 1980	Triumph Dolomite 1850
1,854 cc (113.1 cu in)	87 mm (3.4 in)	78 mm (3.1 in)	9.0:1	1x Zenith-Stromberg 175 CD	88 hp (65.6 kW) at 5000 rpm	147 ft⋅lb (199.3 N⋅m) at 3000 rpm	1971–1974	Saab 99 - single carb
1,854 cc (113.1 cu in)	87 mm (3.4 in)	78 mm (3.1 in)	9.0:1	Bosch D-Jetronic	95–97 hp (70.8–72.3 kW) at 5000 rpm	147 ft⋅lb (199.3 N⋅m) at 3500 rpm	1971 - 1972	Fuel-injected Saab 99 1.85 L
1,998 cc (121.9 cu in)	90.3 mm (3.6 in)	78 mm (3.1 in)	9.5:1	2x SU HS6	127 hp (94.7 kW) at 5700 rpm	122 ft⋅lb (165.4 N⋅m) at 4500 rpm	1972 - 1980	Sprint 16V engine
1,998 cc (121.9 cu in)	90.3 mm (3.6 in)	78 mm (3.1 in)	9.25:1	2x SU HS6	105 hp (78.3 kW) at 5500 rpm	119 ft⋅lb (161.3 N⋅m) at 3500 rpm	1975 - 1981	TR7

== Motorsports ==
The 16-valve Sprint engine was raced in FIA Group 1 and Group 2 in Dolomite Sprints prepared by Leyland Special Tuning at Abingdon. Their first season was 1974, but no finishes were achieved that year. In 1975 the engines received larger carburettors and a revised camshaft. With these changes they completed their first event at the Mintex Rally in 7th place. This was followed by a 2nd place in the Avon Tour of Britain and a 3rd at the Lindisfarne Rally. At the Lombard RAC Rally the Dolomite Sprint won the 2-litre class and Group 1 outright and placed 16th overall. For 1976 focus had shifted to the TR7, originally with the Sprint engine but by 1978 all efforts were focused on the TR8.

The private Broadspeed team headed by Ralph Broad did extensive development on the Sprint engine, bringing power up to a claimed 174 bhp (129.8 kW). Sprint-powered Broadspeed cars won the Manufacturer's Championship in 1974 and took the driver's title in 1975. In 1976 the cars took 2nd in the 2-litre class, and won again in 1978.

The Sprint engine also appeared in Formula Three, in Anson Cars and March Engineering chassis. The Sprint-powered March placed 8th in the 1976 season. In 1979 two March cars driven by Nigel Mansell and Brett Riley finished 5th and 8th in the F3 championship and each driver won one race in the Vandervell British F3 Championship.
