= Triumph V8 =

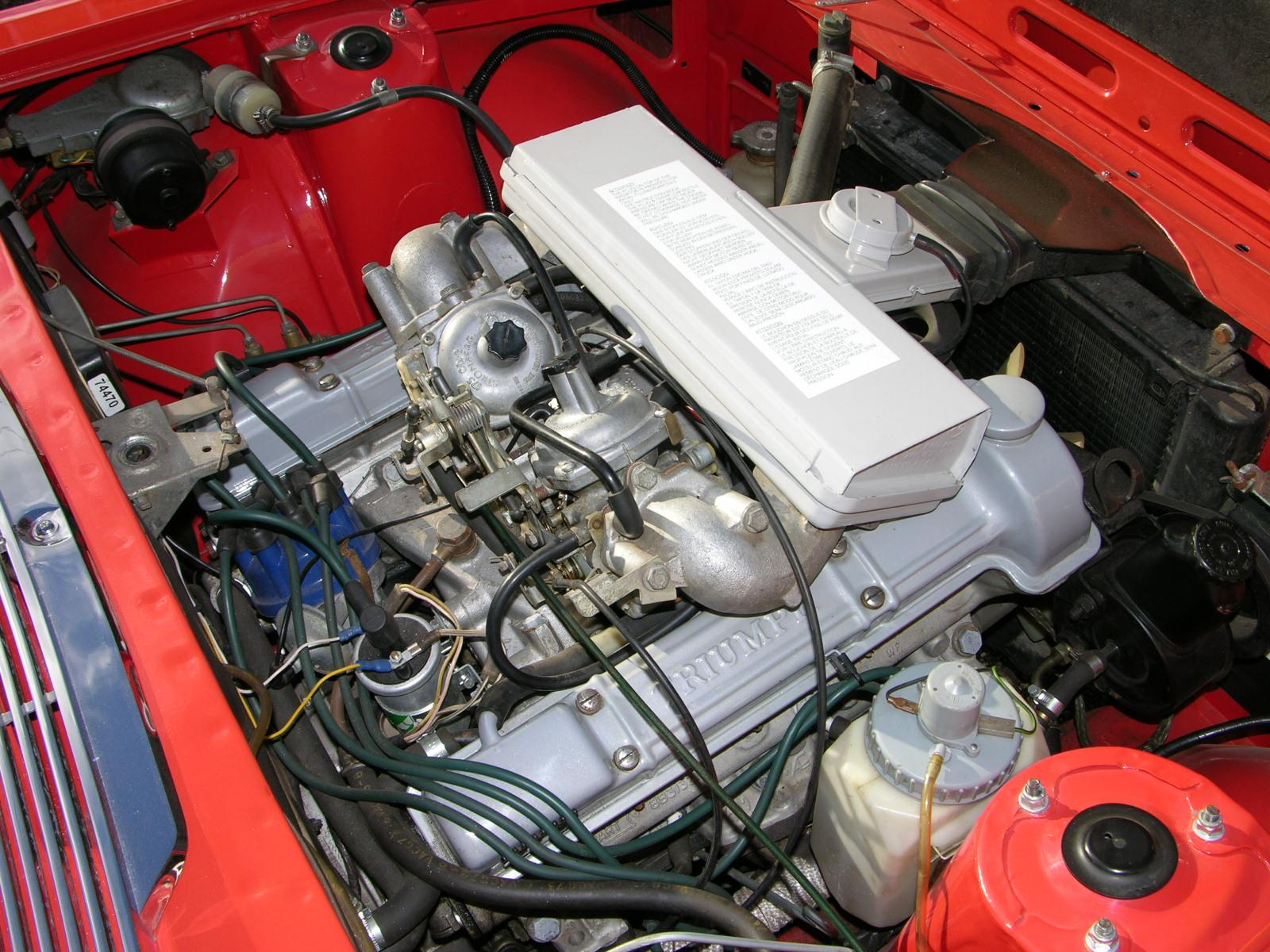

Overview
- Manufacturer: Triumph Motor Company
- Production: 1970–1977

Layout
- Displacement: 2,997 cc (182.9 cu in)
- Cylinder bore: 86 mm (3.386 in)
- Piston stroke: 64.5 mm (2.539 in)
- Cylinder block material: Cast iron
- Cylinder head material: Aluminium
- Valvetrain: SOHC per bank
- Compression ratio: 8.8:1

Combustion
- Fuel system: Carburettor
- Fuel type: Petrol
- Oil system: Wet sump
- Cooling system: Water-cooled

Output
- Power output: 145 bhp (108 kW) @5500 rpm
- Torque output: 170 lb⋅ft (230 N⋅m) @3500 rpm

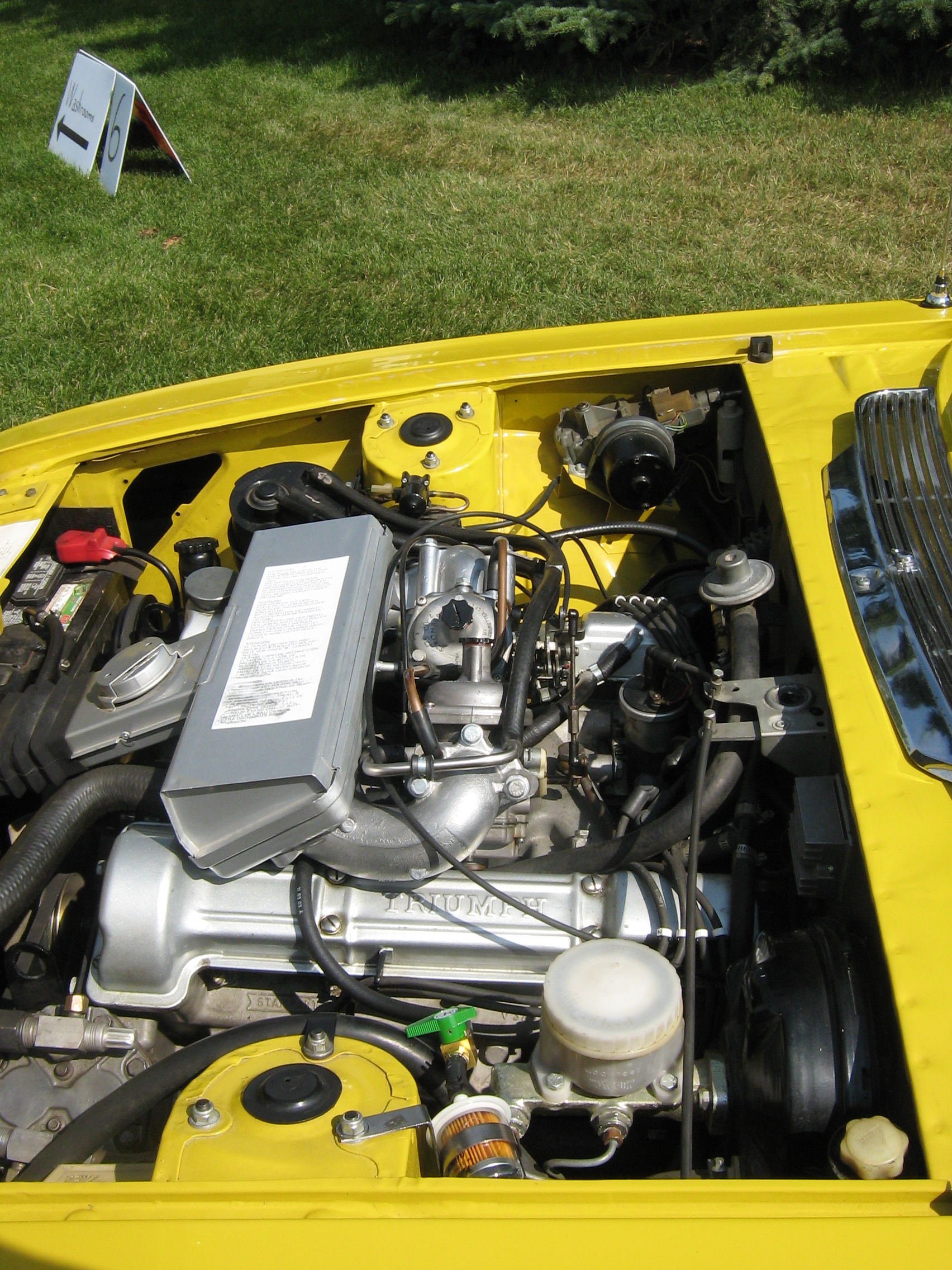
Triumph Stag with its original V8 engine

The Triumph V8 is a 3.0 litre V8 developed and built by the Triumph Motor Company for the Triumph Stag. The engine was a development of the Triumph slant-four engine. It consisted of a cast iron block and aluminium cylinder heads with a single overhead cam per bank.

== Development ==
The Stag was developed between 1964 and 1969. Whilst originally seen as little more than a convertible version of the Triumph 2000 saloon, as development progressed the Stag gained its own identity until the final design shared no body panels or pressings with the 2000. The Stag was intended to use Triumph's existing 2.5-litre straight-6 engine. When the Stag design evolved into a grand tourer rather than a more conventional sports car it became clear that a more powerful, more refined engine was needed.

As far back as 1963 the designer of the Triumph Slant-4 engine, Lewis Dawtrey, had foreseen the possibility that the engine design could be 'doubled-up' to create a V8 unit. This was not a unique approach; Vauxhall had followed a similar strategy, designing its own slant-4 so that two could be joined to make a V8 (which, ultimately, Vauxhall did not pursue). Whilst at this point the engine had only been produced in 1.7-litre form by Triumph for sale to Saab, the basic design of the engine enabled capacities as low as 1.2-litres to be built. Triumph revived the V8 concept, initially settling on a 2.5-litre engine (in essence two 1.2-litre versions of the slant-4) with mechanical fuel injection provided by Bosch.

Following the take-over of Rover by Leyland Motors in 1967 Spen King was placed in charge of product development at Triumph. The V8's Bosch fuel injection was running into numerous difficulties in development and King was unable to convince Leyland to divert extra funds to Triumph to solve the problems. Instead, King dropped the fuel injection in favour of twin Zenith-Stromberg carburetors. To maintain the required power output the capacity was increased to 3-litres, which then entailed modification to the Stag's other drivetrain systems including the gearbox, back axle and brakes. This relatively 'last-minute' capacity increase was achieved by expanding the bore of the engine instead of the stroke, which explains the Triumph V8's unusual 'oversquare' internal dimensions.

== Design ==
As launched in 1970 the Triumph V8 had several innovative features. As well as its unusual construction (the crankcase and cylinder block were made from chromium iron whilst the cylinder heads were aluminium alloy), the engine featured a unique arrangement of studs and bolts attaching the cylinderheads that allowed the cylinderheads to be removed (in design, not in reality) without firstly removing the overhead camshafts and disturbing the valveplay adjustment. The water pump, oil pump and distributor were all driven at their required speeds from a single jackshaft driven from the timing chain via sets of skew-cut gears. The cooling fan was a 16-blade plastic item driven through a hydraulic viscous coupling that limited fan speed to 2,500 rpm to reduce noise as well as controlling the fan speed in relation to engine temperature. Had an unverifiable propensity for overheating when mounted in a Stag chassis.

== Potential other uses ==
Triumph originally intended their V8 to be used across their range, which was the reason for the company's willingness to fund the engine's high development costs. Plans were made to create a 'Triumph 3000' by fitting the engine into the 2000 saloon, but these plans were halted when Rover joined Triumph in the Leyland grouping as the resulting car would have been a direct competitor for the Rover 'P6' 3500. Triumph also tried to sell the engine to the Morgan Motor Company but that company chose the Rover V8 as well. It is believed that Saab tested the V8 for the Saab 99 mainly for US markets but the oil crisis in 1973 finally caused cancellation of the project in favour of turbocharging, and no documents of the project nor any prototypes have survived. The result was the V8 remained unique to the Stag.

== See also ==
- Triumph Motor Company
- Triumph Slant-4 engine
