= Triumph TR7 Sprint =

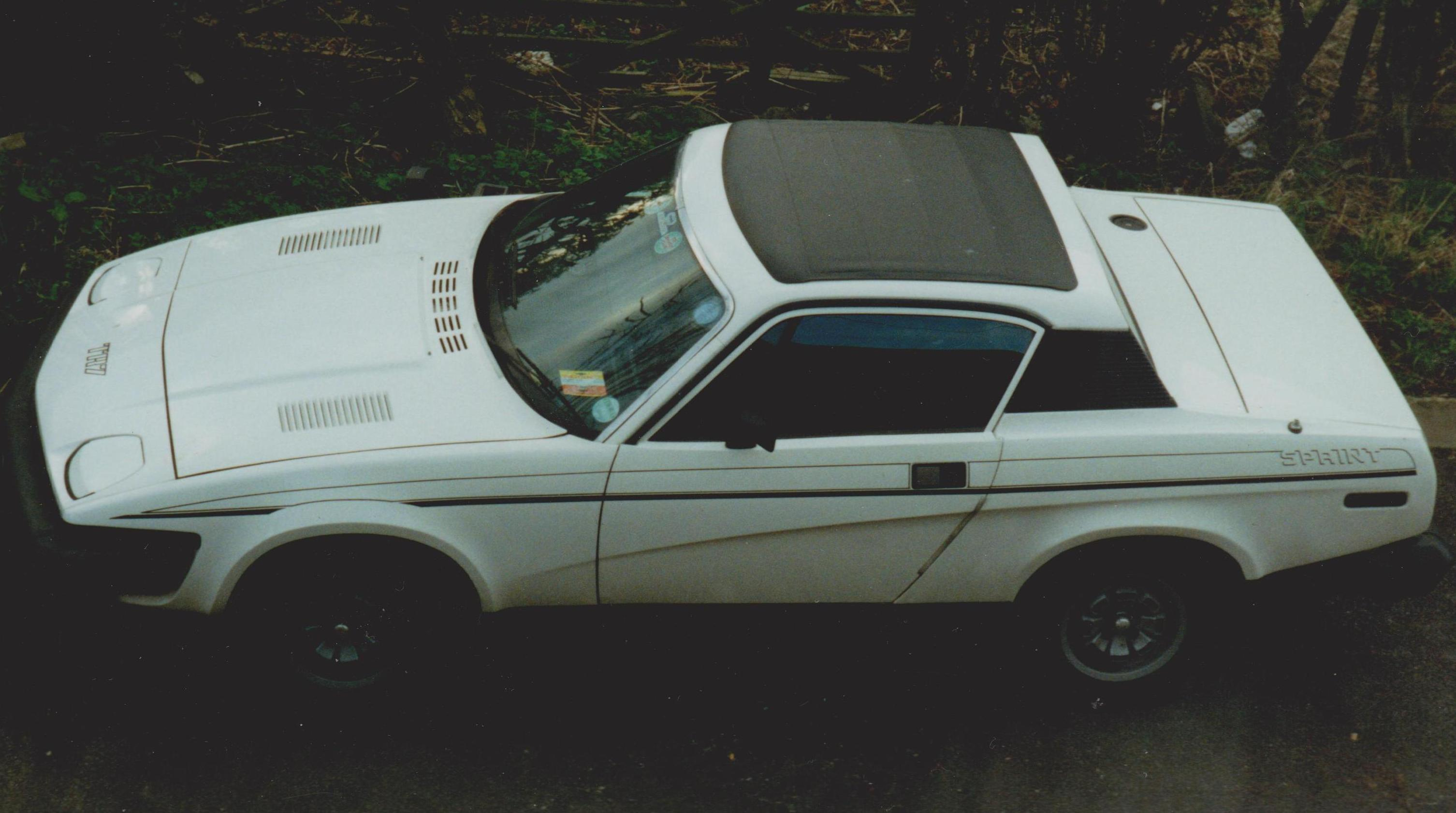
- TR7 Sprint

Overview
- Manufacturer: Triumph (British Leyland)
- Production: 1977; 59–61 made
- Assembly: United Kingdom: Speke, Liverpool
- Designer: Harris Mann, Spen King

Body and chassis
- Class: Sports car
- Body style: 2-door coupé
- Layout: FR layout
- Related: Triumph TR7

Powertrain
- Engine: 1,998 cc (2.0 L) 16-valve Slant-4
- Transmission: 5-speed manual

Dimensions
- Wheelbase: 85 in (2,159.0 mm)
- Length: 160 in (4,064.0 mm)
- Width: 62 in (1,574.8 mm)
- Height: 50 in (1,270.0 mm)
- Curb weight: 1,083 kg (2,387.6 lb)

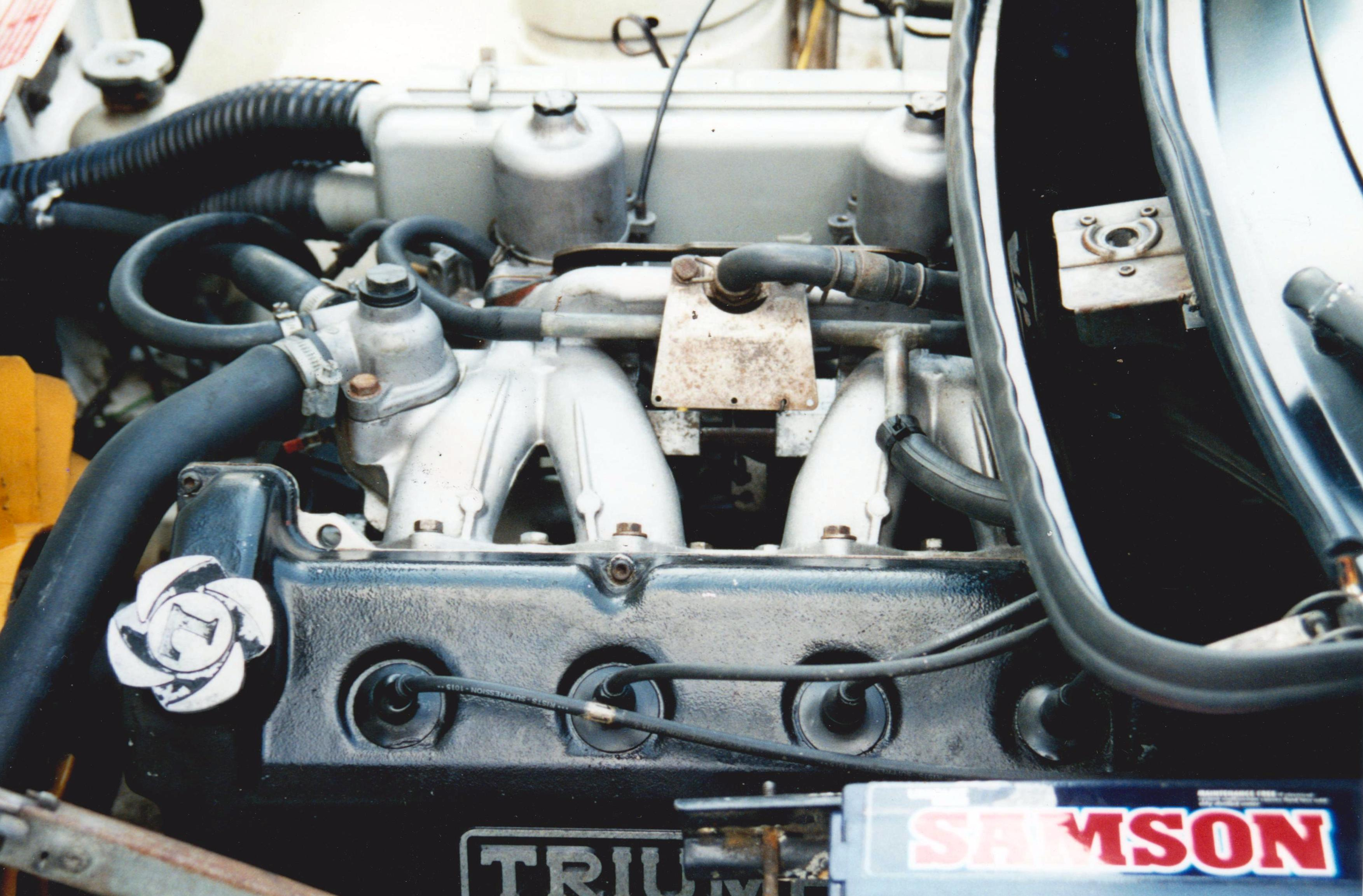
Figure 2: TR7 Sprint Engine Bay from Left

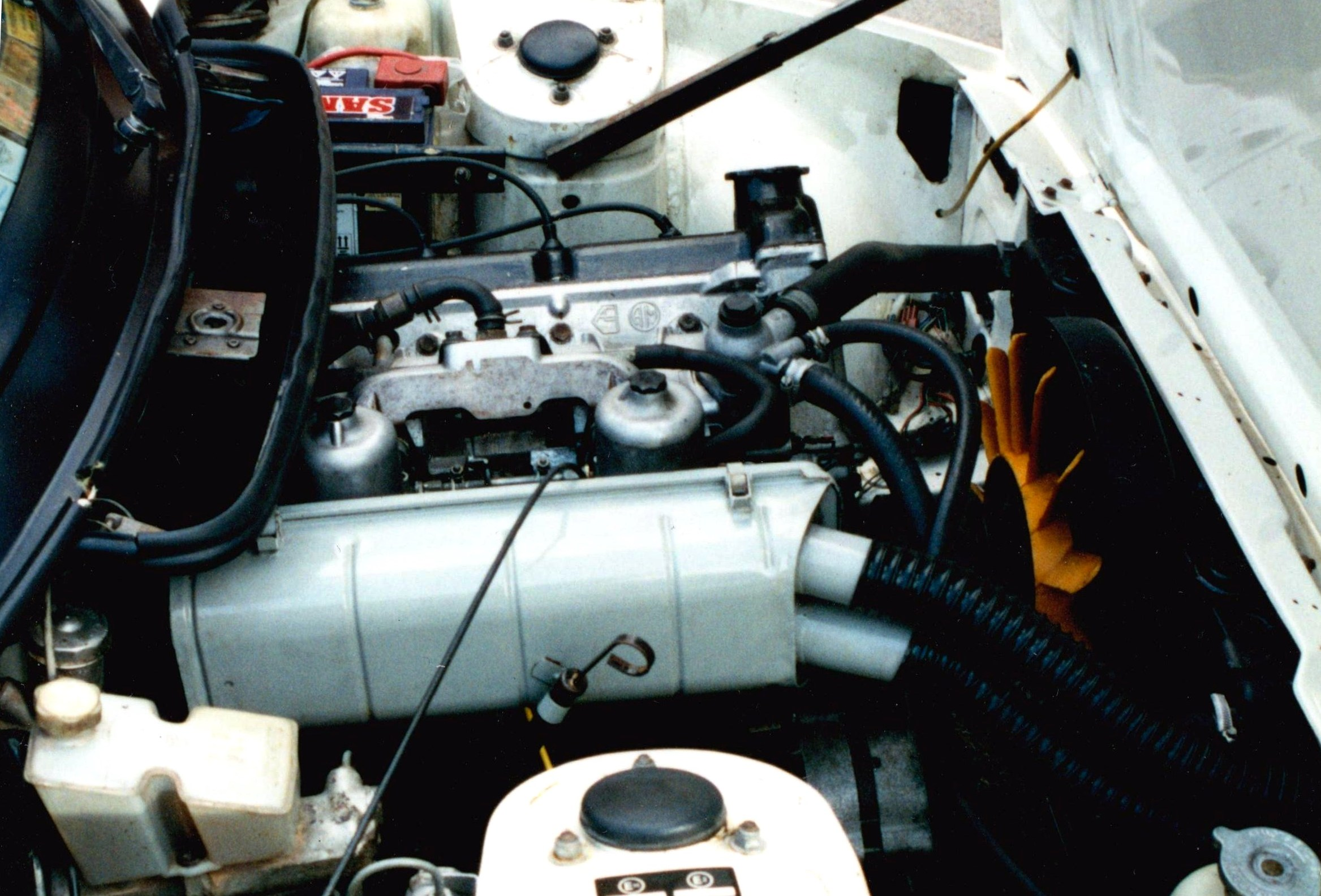
Figure 3: TR7 Sprint Engine Bay from Right

The Triumph TR7 Sprint version of the Triumph TR7 sports car was produced in 1977 by the Triumph Motor Company, then part of British Leyland. However, it was produced in only very limited numbers: Probably a maximum of 61 in total were manufactured. It used the 127 bhp, 16-valve, 2-litre version of the Triumph slant-four engine from the Triumph Dolomite Sprint, a highly tuned version of which, "rated at 225 bhp at 8000 rpm" by 1977, was used in the Group 4 TR7 cars of the BL works rally team, from 1976 until 1978. This was instead of the TR7 base model's 105 bhp, 8-valve, 2-litre version of the same basic slant-4 engine. The 16-valve version was originally specified in the Dolomite Sprint at 135 bhp, and "Spencer King relates how he went away on holiday and came back to find an engine running on the bed giving 150 bhp at the first build." (Note: The power and torque figures given are for the 16 valve, 2 litre, slant four engine in a Dolomite Sprint. The TR7 Sprint had a different exhaust manifold - as the Dolomite one interfered with the bulkhead -, which may have been less restrictive and given more power/torque.)

The reasons why so few TR7 Sprints were produced has been a matter of some debate, since it was never a catalogued model. It is widely assumed that the TR7 Sprints were built with the intention of it being produced for sale, but cancelled after only a few had been made. The suggestions are that it was either cancelled as a result of industrial action, and the consequent loss of BL's market share, or because the sales and marketing department did not want it, as it was not a sufficient improvement over the TR7 base model or because it could not meet the 1976 changes to emissions legislation requirements for the US market - at which the TR7 and later TR8 were primarily aimed. It has also been noted that none of the suggested reasons for cancellation are a good match for when the main production ceased about the end of June 1977. Neither do they explain why a 16-valve model would have started production with the TR8 so near, why no proper records for the model have been found, nor why the cars that were built would have been sold off, rather than scrapped or returned to normal specification - as happened to the 25 or so O-series engined TR7 version development cars when that programme was cancelled a few years later. (Note: An article about the TR7 and TR8 experimental records on Canley Classics website suggests the O-series TR7 development fleet cars were scrapped or converted to TR8 specification before disposal in 1981.)

There is, however, some evidence that the 16-valve TR7 model was cancelled in favour of the TR8 in 1975 or 1976, but BL had still needed some 16-valve engined TR7s in 1977 as homologation specials. The cancellation was with that of the proposed Dolomite replacement Triumph SD2, which was also to use the 16-valve version of the slant-four engine and an electronic fuel injection system that should have met US emissions requirements. These were cancelled after British Leyland went bankrupt in late 1974 and was essentially nationalized under the almost £3 billion plan in the 1975 Ryder Report (British Leyland), which was still in force well into 1977. And several sources note that the 16-valve TR7 model was cancelled at the same time as or before this injection system. The need for homologation, and some production 16-valve TR7s that had to be "meant for the normal sale" and needed some supporting documentation, was to continue rallying the 16-valve Group-4 TR7 into 1978. This followed a change to the FIA's rules disallowing approval on 100 kits of parts (the 100-off rule), and a ban on some components including optional multi-valve cylinder heads, which applied to the TR7 and several other rally cars from the end of 1977. Several pictures in the British Motor Museum archives, titled "TR7 Sprint Homologation" and dated 1 Nov. 1977, show one of the TR7 Sprints. A second approval for the use of the 16-valve head on the Group 4 TR7 rally car was granted by the FIA in February 1978 in time for its use in the Mintex rally of that year.

== Technical specification ==
Engine: Triumph Slant Four 1,998cc 16 valve

Capacity: 1998 cc

Valves: 16

Compression ratio: 9.5:1

Fuel system: Twin 1¾" choke SU HS6 carburettors

Maximum Power: 127 bhp @ 5200 rpm (estimated)

Maximum Torque: 122 lb ft @ 4500 rpm (estimated)

== Performance Data ==
0–60 mph: 8.5 seconds (estimated)

Max speed: 120 mph (estimated)

The improvements in the 0–60 time and top speed over the TR7's 9.6 seconds and 111 mph are not huge. However, the figures for the 16 valve version of the TR7 are almost identical to those for the US specification carburettor version of the 3.5 litre 135 bhp Rover V8 powered Triumph TR8, which are 120 mph and 8.4 seconds. Also, one of the then Triumph engine development engineers is quoted as saying "The real test was the 30–50, 50–70 [mph] times and here the Sprint was significantly superior to the 2V [2 valves per cylinder] engine and even challenged the TR8's abilities. Certainly, if we were going 'off site' the preferred vehicle to 'borrow' was a Sprint TR7 over all others and that includes the TR8."

Also, The Sprint not only had more torque and power than the TR7, but peak values significantly higher in the rev range - presumably leading to a significant improved driver experience and the preference for this vehicle mentioned above. However, the production TR7 Sprints retained the gearbox and 3.9:1 final drive ratios of the TR7; where a number of converters of TR7s to TR7 Sprints suggests it benefits significantly from the use of the 6-cylinder SD1's 3.45:1 final drive or, with tuned engines, even the SD1 3500 or TR8 3.09:1 ratio (which all fit the 5-speed TR7 axle). Hence, given a change in ratio, even to an available alternative value, the resulting figures might have been an even bigger improvement over the TR7's.

Further, despite being specified at 127 bhp, Spen King related "how he went away on holiday and came back to find an engine running on the bed giving 150 bhp at the first build." This would be very close to the 153 PS DIN (±5%) that was given by the Rover V8 engine in the UK Specification TR8 (and higher in the rev range). Hence, it is possible that had Triumph produced the TR7 Sprint and TR8 to UK specification, as was apparently planned at one time, there likely would have been significant debate of their relative merits.

== Production details ==
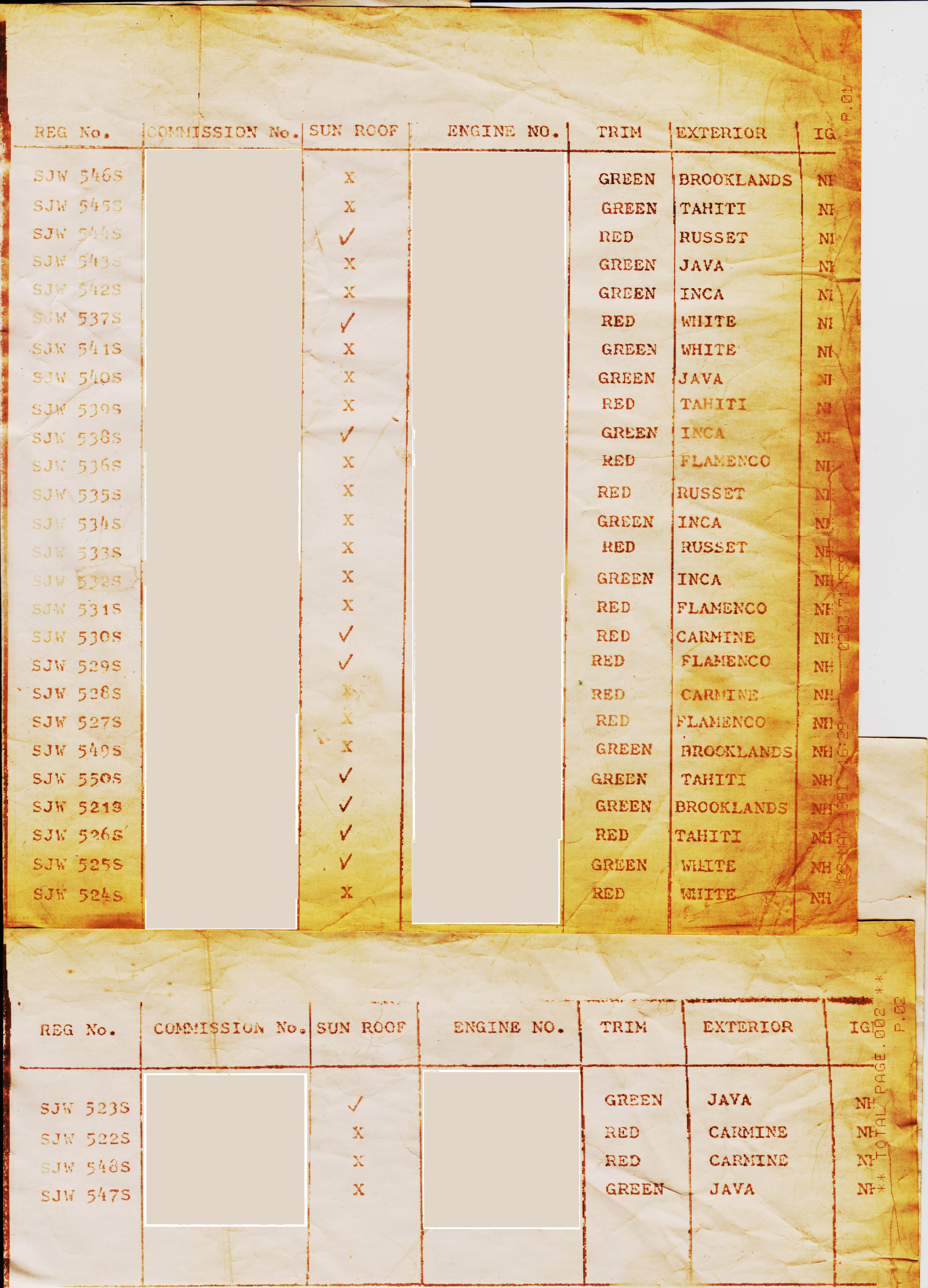
Figure 4: Press Garage TR7 Sprint Registrations

According to the British Motor Industry Heritage Trust (BMIHT) archives at the British Motor Museum, Gaydon, there are production records for chassis numbers ACH/4 to ACH/25, and ACH/00501 to ACH/00535 and ACH/00700: 58 cars. (Note: This chassis number format is taken from BMIHT Production Record Trace Certificate Number 90/5959 for VVC 697S, dated 25th April 1990, which indicates it as being "RHD, Home Market" Specification. The leading zeros are also visible on the chassis plate shown in Figure 5 and on one shown at '5'.) Also, ACH 1 is identified by the TR Drivers Club, as UK registration WAC 274S, and that ACH 2 and ACH 3 existed might have been inferred from this: "One [unattributed] source states that there were three batches of Sprints, ACH 1 to ACH 25, ACH 501 to ACH 536 and ACH 700 on its own, a total of 62 vehicles." However, following a requested search of the BMIHT records it was discovered that "the build records we have for ACH/000535 cover 4 separate sheets and there is no record or build card for chassis number 536 as the next vehicle is chassis number 700." What production records there are at the BMIHT do not provide registration details from which cars might be traced; however, some further details of the cars known to have been produced are provided by the TR Drivers Club.()

While the 'A' in the ACH prefix to the commissioning numbers indicate that the factory TR7 Sprints were built at Speke, a Triumph engine development engineer is quoted as saying "Some if not all of these cars were definitely converted at Canley from 8-valve to 16-valve". The reason given for this is that "the Speke unions wanted added bonuses for dealing with 'non-standard' cars." However, there were at least some built on the production line at Speke: another Triumph employee, responsible for engineering liaison between Speke and Canley, is quoted as saying that "At the changeover in July 1977 (to the new common underframe) we built a batch of thirty TR7 Sprints."

The TR Drivers Club website gives details for only two of the first group of 25 chassis numbers: what was presumably the first prototype, WAC 274S, and one other, WAC 253S. Both known cars from this group were registered in Coventry in September 1977. It is suggested that most of the other cars in this batch were LHD and sold abroad. According to an inspection of the BMIHT archives, of the cars in this batch of 25 chassis numbers, at least were 11 LHD (some records have been lost) and 3 were UK specification - the remaining 11 are 'unknown' but assumed to be LHD.

The first two cars of the second group of chassis numbers were both white, and registered in Coventry as VVC 696S and VVC 697S in August 1977. These were, according to an owner written article in the TR Driver's Club Magazine from 1991,() used for reliability testing. While there are no reliable details for BL's use of these actual cars, according to one source the procedure used with the TR7 and TR8 was to run a test car on the Belgian pavé track at MIRA for 1000 miles, "effectively providing wear harder than a vehicle might experience in a lifetime of normal use". The same source also states that "A related assessment exercise for the TR7 was the '90 day corrosion test', for which a prototype was built without the usual zinc primer or anti-corrosion treatments and the body painted white, the best colour to show up any rust streaks." A Triumph engineer is quoted as saying, "this prototype was run around a variety of road surfaces under wet conditions and then the damp areas were checked. The vehicle was then fitted with a series of nozzles which sprayed salt solution into these same areas".

Thirty cars from this second group of chassis numbers were sequentially registered SJW 521S to SJW 550S (see Figure 4) in Birmingham in three groups in November 1977, and it is repeatedly claimed that they went to the BL press garage at the Canley site, Coventry; presumably for publicity purposes. It is also claimed that these cars were stripped and re-trimmed, and possibly also re-sprayed. However, the only evidence for this is that production record trace certificates for many of these SJW cars from the BMIHT state they were for a press release, and such cars would normally have gone to the Press garage. This statement is itself based only on most of the cars having "UK PRESS VEHICLE" handwritten in felt-tip pen on their build cards. Also, the TR7 Sprint Homologation pictures show no evidence of the work it is suggested would have been done to a press car, even though the pictures were taken only days before its disposal by Sales and Marketing Dept. and months after its production and departure from Speke in July 1977.

Another car of this second group of chassis numbers was registered in Coventry as ARW 181S in July 1978. According to a letter from the then archivist, reporting the research of the BMIHT records, "This car was originally intended for display at the 1977 [ Daily Express ] Motorfair in Earls Court, London. We can not verify whether it was in fact displayed here." This car was factory fitted with engine CH 2 HE which it still has as of September 2017.

It seems that the last car built in October 1977, ACH/00700, was intended for a motorshow in Scotland. However, again, it is not known if it was actually used for that.

The addition of two leading zeros to this second group of chassis numbers to make them five digits, the same length as production TR7's chassis numbers, may indicate these were pre-production cars, not prototypes. However, the differences in where and by which division of BL they were registered (from their (V55) registration documents), indicates that they may still not have been manufactured as a single batch. Hence, it is possible that the press garage (SJW) cars were the "batch of thirty TR7 Sprints" built at "the changeover in July 1977", and the cars in the first group, and possibly some of the second, may have been those built as 8-valve cars at Speke, and converted to 16-valve at Canley.

== Distinguishing features ==
"There are a [comparatively] large number of privately built Sprint conversions about... Buyers should beware of this if they are asked a premium price for an alleged 'genuine' TR7 Sprint": all the essential parts to turn a TR7 into a functional copy of a TR7 Sprint, though not an identical one, can either be sourced from a Dolomite Sprint or remain available from suppliers; several companies sell conversion kits online; and several sources provide information and advice on this TR7 Sprint conversion. One of which states, "this upgrade brings you into the same power band as an original TR8, but for a fraction of the cost, effort and time." There are also a number of websites dedicated to the Sprint and Sprint conversions, () and at least one forum.

It seems that there is no disagreement that "[a]ll [factory TR7 Sprint] cars were fixed-head coupes", that the period over which they were built spans the changeover between the 1977 and 1978 year models, (Note: The significant differences between 1977 and 1978 year model cars are in the sizes of the filler cap, the 1977 year model having a very large one and the 1978 model having a smaller one; and in the positioning of the interior lights, the 1977 having a light in the headlining and a map light behind and between the seats, and the 1978 having rocking-switch lights in both doors. These modifications were necessary for the TR7 convertible, which was also in design/prototype/pre-production in 1977-8.) and both right and left hand drive cars were produced. Those TR7 Sprints that are known were fitted with the 5-speed gearbox mated to the 3.89:1 rear axle that was standard on the 5-speed TR7s. The pre-production cars had the alloy wheels that were optional for later TR7s and standard on Solihull built fixed-heads.

=== Engine and interior ===
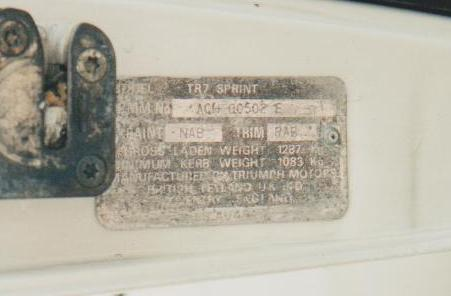
Figure 5: TR7 Sprint Chassis Plate

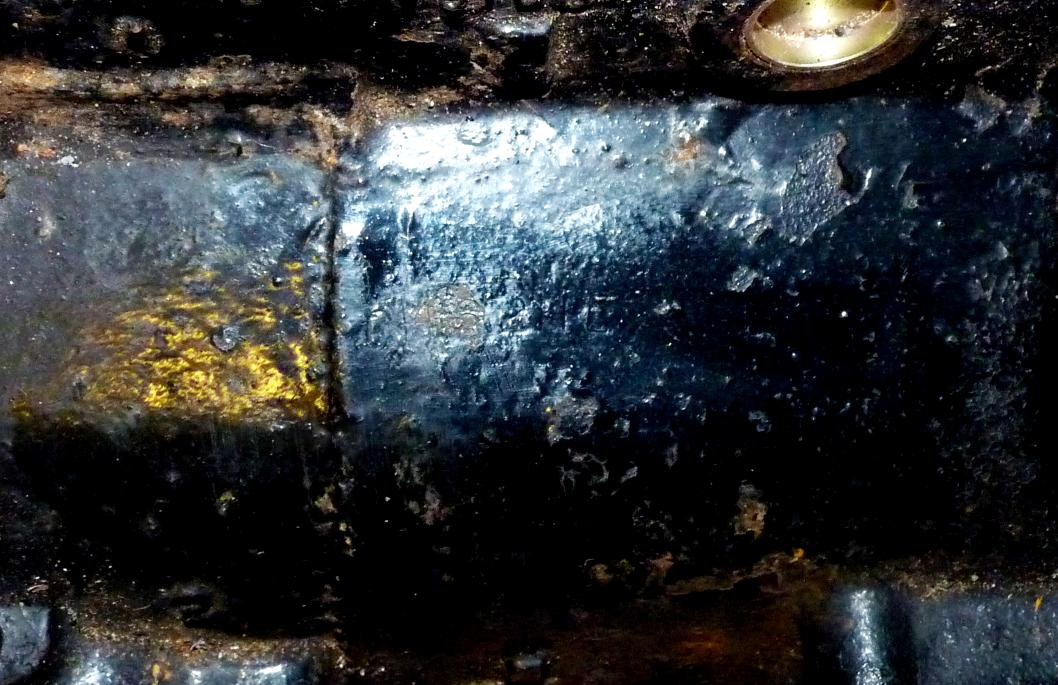
Figure 6: TR7 Sprint Engine number stamping (CH62HE)

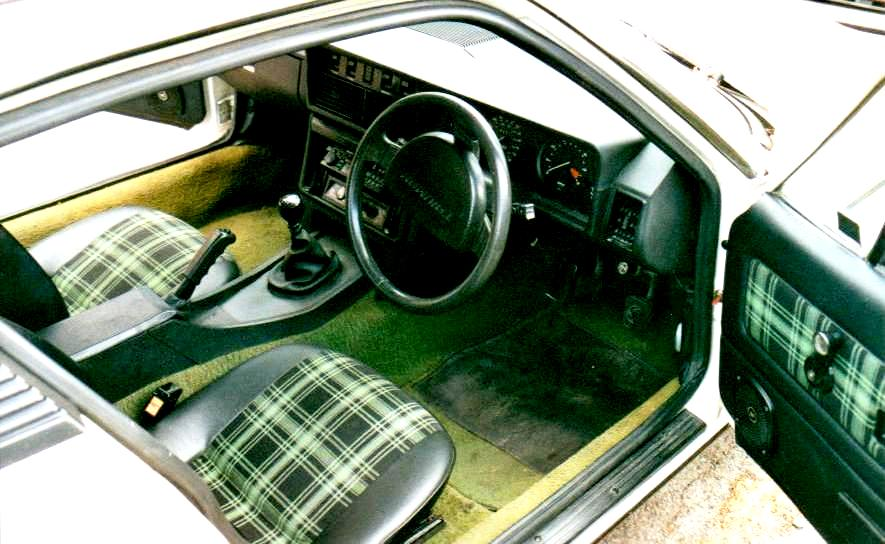
Figure 7: TR7 Sprint Interior

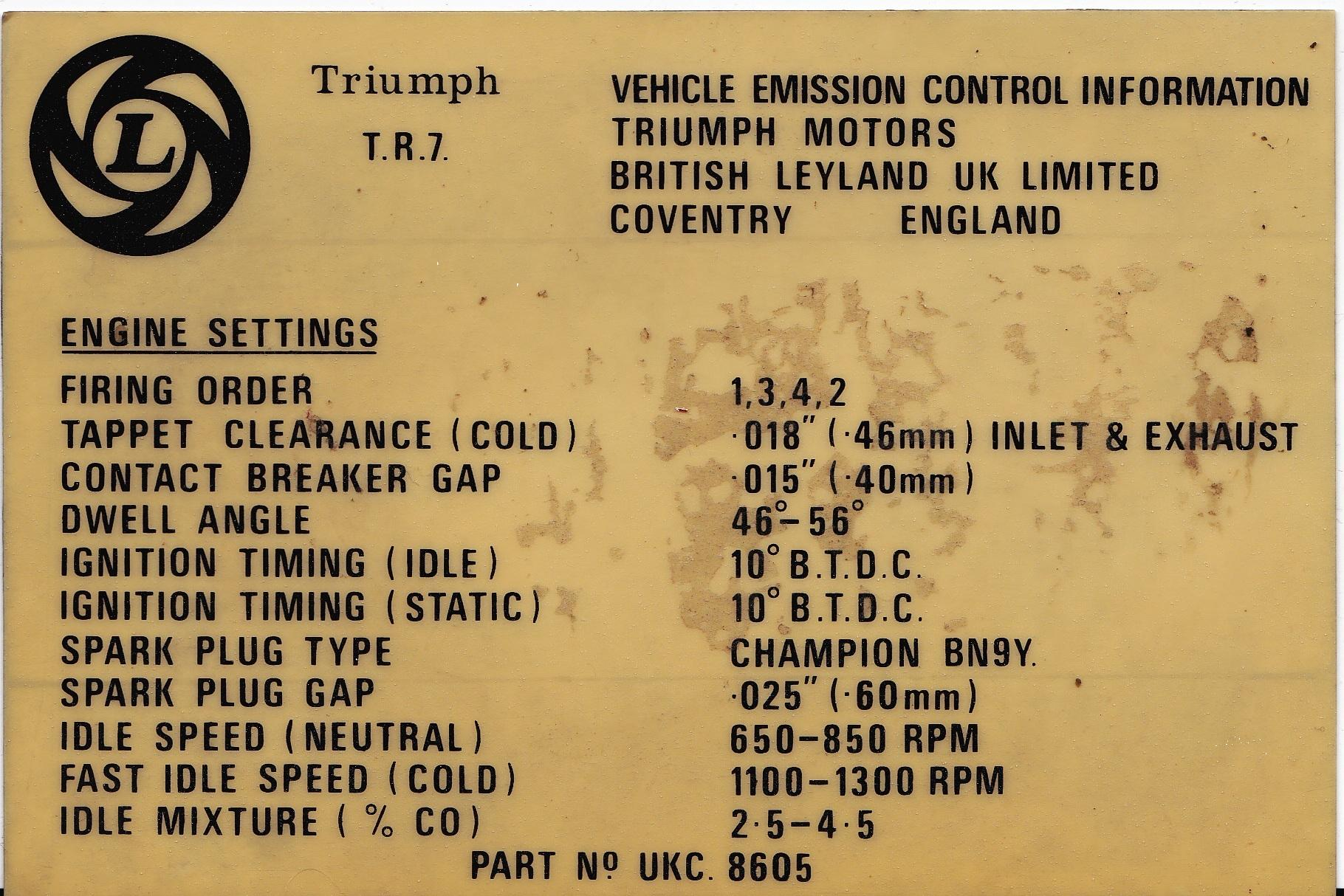
Figure 8: TR7 Sprint Engine Information Panel, UKC 8605, from one of test track cars

The factory produced TR7 Sprints have chassis numbers that are prefixed with letters ACH; whereas, UK/Australian/European specification TR7s of the time were prefixed ACG: Figure 5 shows a chassis or commissioning plate from a TR7 Sprint car, mounted on the left-hand door, below the door lock. The TR7 Sprint engines are also prefixed with CH, rather than GC on the TR7's and VA on Dolomite Sprint engines; however, the TR7 Sprint engine numbers can, at least in some cases, be very hard to read (see Figure 6).

There are a number of auxiliary engine parts specific to the TR7 Sprint, and not used on the Dolomite Sprint engine: the cast steel exhaust manifold (RKC2788), the front pipe of the exhaust system (which has been remanufactured, RB7385), and a water transfer plate at the back of the cylinder head (also remanufactured, RB7240).

A number of parts in the throttle linkage are also unique to the TR7 Sprint, most obviously the (unused) air-conditioning full-throttle cut-off switch mounting plate between the two carburettors (just visible in Figure 2, and partially obscuring the inlet manifold in Figure 3), which was not fitted to the Dolomite Sprint; and the throttle lever/link rod (visible just over the air box in Figure 3), which looks the same as the TR7 part, but is longer to allow for the carbs being further apart.

The front disks were specific to the TR7 Sprint, although the callipers and dust shields, etc., were as those used on the TR8; so TR8 disks fit.

There are also at least two different Engine information panels (UKC 8605 and TKC 5228), on the underside of the bonnet, some of which only indicate TR7, but provide slightly different information to that on the equivalent TR7 part (UKC 6246).

There are online photographs of some of these parts.()

At least some of the cars were fitted with the large semi-circular pad on the steering wheel from the US specification TR7 (RKC82) (see Figure 7).

There is one unsupported claim that "Having a higher-revving engine, the Sprint received a recalibrated rev counter". However, this is incorrect: both engines had a rev limit of 6500 rpm indicated on the rev counter, though both owners' manuals give the "Maximum recommended engine speed (intermittent)" as 6,000 rpm. Hence, the TR7 and TR7 Sprint shared a common rev counter.

=== Exterior ===
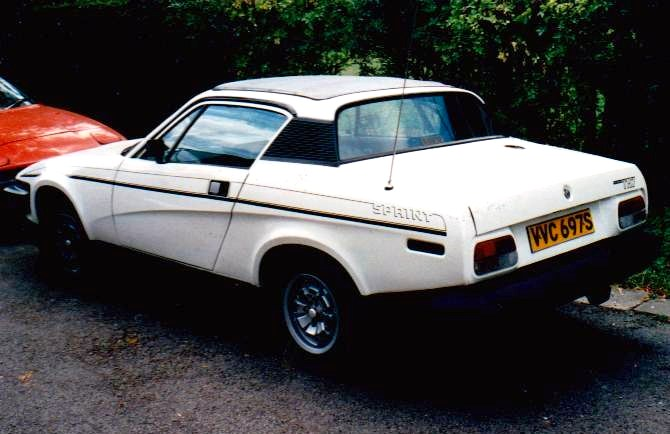
Figure 9: TR7 Sprint from rear, showing side stripe intended for the production version

It appears that the exterior of the pre-production TR7 Sprints was, and presumably the production cars would have been, indistinguishable from the TR7 of the day, apart from the decals and side stripes. However, it is reported that a number of different decal sets were being tried out on the prototype cars.

There are a number of published photographs of TR7 Sprints bearing decals simply comprising the word "SPRINT" on the front panel and boot lid below the 'TR7' decal of Speke built TR7s, and described as "The logo that appeared on the boot lid of most of the few TR7 Sprints that escaped from the factory." These used the same font as the TR7 decal applied to Speke built TR7s and in the side stripes used later on the TR7 Premium edition. There is also a description of a car "with the word 'Sprint' written large on the right of the boot lid, the TR7 decal being on the left". However, none of these photographs can be identified to cars that had not been owner modified. Whereas, these decals form part of the set displayed on the FHC TR8 shown in the TR8's homologation papers (FIA #654), identifying it as a "Sprint TR7 V8". These Sprint decals were at one time available (in three sizes) from Moss Europe (previously TriumphTune), though they were not catalogue items or identified to a BL part number or numbers. One size is still available as supplier part No. RB7206BLACK/SILVER/GOLD.

There is also a published photograph of what appears to be a US Spec., 1977 year model car carrying side stripes with the word "Sprint" on the rear wings, the caption to which states "The sides of the TR7 Sprint were supposed to have received this striping treatment, designed by John Ashford, had the car gone into production." These side stripes were, at one time, listed by Moss Europe under BL part numbers YKC2082-2087. They are also shown in a series of 6 "TR7 Sprint Homologation" photographs in the BMIHT Film and Picture Library, taken on 1 November 1977 before the car was sold-off by BL. The car in these photographs from the BMIHT does not carry the "SPRINT" decals, described above, on either boot lid or front panel. The TR7 Sprint shown in figures 1 and 8 is, in this respect, identical with these photographs, except for the colours. The stripes themselves were later reworked for the TR7 Premium edition after the TR7 Sprint was still born.

== Publications ==
The BL TR7 Repair Operations Manual, AKM3079A, covers both the 4 and 2 valve (per cylinder) engines; however, an erratum stuck to the title page states "At the time of going to press the 4 valve engine referred to in this manual has not been fitted to the Triumph TR7".

An owner's handbook, AKM 3967, was also produced for TR7 Sprint in 1977, but is apparently for the 1977 year model: it shows the interior light in the headlining not the doors. Also some of the information is incorrect for the TR7 Sprint, i.e. pictures show the 8 valve engine and the TR7's AC Delco distributor. However, it also lists only the 5 speed (LT77) gearbox, unlike the similar handbook for the TR7, RTC 9210, which lists the 4 speed, and the 5 speed as an option.

The FIA's 1976 rules for homologation, which applied to the re-homologation of the 16-valve head for the group 4 TR7 rally car, approved in February 1978, state that in "checking of a model of car against its recognition form" the scruteneers may refer to "the maintenance booklet published for the use of the make's distributors". These two documents may have been intended to fulfil such a requirement, since the handbook is not intended for the distributor and the ROM is not well described as a booklet.

== Motorsports ==
The TR7s used by BL in Group 4 rallying, from their advent in the Welsh rally of 1976 to the Circuit of Ireland in 1978, also used (tuned) 16-valve 2 litre Sprint engines, which by 1977 was rated at "rated at 225 bhp at 8000 rpm". These 16-valve TR7 rally cars proved competitive on asphalt, winning a number of events including the Belgian Boucles de Spa rally in 1977. They were replaced by the Rover V8 3.5 litre engined TR7V8. (Note: According to Graham Robson, "by April 1978 [when it was homologated] the TR8 had not been launched, so as a compromise to keep BL marketing people happy, it was called TR7V8 instead.")

Four of the later BL works rally cars carried the registrations of cars from the press garage, SJW 533S, SJW 540S, SJW 546S, and SJW 548S. SJW 533S was initially campaigned as a 4 cylinder 16 valve car, and later as a V8 3.5 Litre TR7V8 specification. The other three were only ever campaigned as TR8s. However, it is not clear whether or not the four rally cars bearing these registrations actually were, in any real sense, the TR7 Sprints from the press garage, or whether only the registrations were used. There is a story at one TR7 related website (), and already current in the 1980s, that John Davenport, "needed white cars without sunrooves [sic] and these were the nearest four." However, Bill Price wrote "As I think is known, four of the [TR7] Sprint press release car registration numbers were 'inherited' by BL Motorsport and used to identify four TR7 V8 'works' rally cars." Also, according to the press garage data (Figure 4), SJW 533S was russet, SJW 540S was java green, SJW 546S was brooklands green, and SJW 548S was carmine; though none had sun-roofs. While there are suggestions that the cars sent to the press garage were re-trimmed and even possibly re-sprayed, there are no suggestions that their paint colours were changed, and the competitions department could, presumably, have managed that themselves, were it significant. Equally anecdotally, a more complete reproduction of the 1991 owner written article from the TR Driver's Club magazine states "Although the SJW TR7V8 rally cars began life as TR7 Sprints, the rally cars were scratch built using bodies taken off the line and prepared by Safety Devices. So only the registration numbers from the sprints were used."()

=== Homologation ===
==== Initial homologation ====
There is some confusion over exactly how the 16-valve TR7 was homologated (for group 4) with the sprint engine, close ratio sprint gearbox and overdrive, and heavy duty rear axle before any TR7 Sprints were produced. Rally journalist and historian Graham Robson refers to the "famous 'inventive homologation' skills" of Bill Price, then workshop manager at BL Special Tuning (ST) at Abingdon, and to him "perhaps, taking lessons from Ralph Broad, who was an old hand at the black art of 'reading the rules'", and states that "Bill [Price] managed to gain approval for a TR7 which was only loosely related to the production car." Bill Price himself wrote on this issue "Careful consideration was given to the existing specification with the result that we decided to list the 16-valve Sprint cylinder head to enable us to virtually transplant the Sprint rally engine into the car. The Sprint gearbox was homologated as the 77mm five-speed [LT77] gearbox was not yet available and it would take time to produce close ratio gears for it. The heavy duty axle which would be standard with the five-speed gearbox was also listed [for Group 3] as an [export] option". However, Graham Robson quotes BL Motorsport director John Davenport remembering "that the '100-off' rule applied to alternative engines at the time (which explains why Ford was able to race 24-valve four-cam Capris in 1974), but this waiver never applied to transmissions."

The 100-off rule was a section of the FIA's rules for homologating Group 4 cars (actually, for homologating Group 2 cars, but also applicable to Group 4). It covered a list of "Optional equipment which may be recognized with a minimum production of 100 units per year to equip 100 cars". While John Davenport was correct that, in 1975, this list included alternative cylinder heads with different numbers of valves, it also did include alternative gearboxes with overdrives, flywheels, clutches and their housing, and many other engine, transmission, and suspension components. Such optional equipment could be recognized as "bolt-on option kits", which had to be "available freely at the manufacturer's or his dealers' for any one wishing to purchase it" - as would have been the case with the 16-valve head and its drive (pistons, carbs, and manifolds could be changed freely for Group 4), and for the overdriven gearbox, which would have been available as spare parts for the Dolomite Sprint (the heavy duty axle was homologated for Group 3, and thus 4, by a different means). But when the 16-valve TR7 was homologated for Group 4 in October 1975, the 100-off rule did not require the production of any 16-valve engined road cars, only the kits needed to equip them.

However, the 100-off rule also required that the kits could be fitted "without it being necessary to machine or modify the remaining mechanical parts" and therefore "it must be possible to reassemble the whole unit with all its original parts", and they "must be mentioned in the manufacturer's catalogue of spare parts for the model concerned". While the FIA rules failed to precisely define the catalogue or its level of distribution, the 16-valve head and overdriven gearbox were not listed in the generally available TR7 parts catalogue. Also, there is no obvious article in the homologation rules that covered the recognition of the heavy duty rear axle in 1975 as an export option for Group 3 - there were mechanisms for recognizing export options for Group 4, but not Group 3. This component was, however, recognized for Group 3 a second time, presumably after the production of sufficient 5-speed TR7s, in January 1977.

A number of other modifications were listed in the amendment (1/1V) to the TR7's homologation for the Group 4 TR7, such as larger front callipers and rear disk brakes. These were allowed from a list of "Optional equipment which may be recognized without a minimum production". Other modifications that are not listed in the papers, such as suspension components and axle locating arms, etc., were given as freely allowed to be changed or added without need of being specifically recognized as part of the homologation process.

==== FIA Rule change for 1976 ====
"Effective from the end of 1977, the FIA banned alternative cylinder heads" and removed the 100-off rule (described above) for 1976. As a result, several teams had, at this time, to remove similar equipment from their cars, including the Toyota Celica, Vauxhall Chevette HS, (Note: The Vauxhall Chevette HS rally cars used the 16-valve Lotus head on the GM block, though the road cars with which it was homologated used the GM 16-valve head. During scrutineering at Rally Portugal in early 1978, it was discovered (among some other issues) that the rally cars were still using the Lotus head, despite the rule change making it illegal. As a result, the Chevette was withdrawn, until the GM 16-valve heads were fitted to the rally cars (and the other issues resolved as well).) and Lancia Stratos. Ford, however, produced additional Ford Escort RS1800 (X0) cars in 1977 and were able to continue to use it (transferred to Group 4 as the Escort RS) with the BDG engine (a 16-valve Cosworth head on an aluminium alloy version of the Kent block) in 1978.

This change to the FIA's rules was published in December 1975, soon after the TR7 was homologated for Group 4, and the ban would come into effect before the TR8 - which was intended to replace the TR7 in rallying -, would be ready: "John Davenport's team had not been certain it would be available to them until the very day that homologation was granted - on 1 April 1978." Hence, BL had the Sprint 16-valve head recognized for a second time, which was granted in February 1978 in time for its use in the Mintex rally of that year. Without the 100-off rule the new rules required the production of at least some 16-valve engined TR7s meant for normal sale, i.e. "distribution of cars to individual purchasers through the normal commercial channels of the manufacturer". While the rules did not specify that any of these cars actually had to have been sold for approval to be granted, it is noted that "[f]ollowing the cancellation of the project, normal practice might have been to dismantle the cars or convert them to normal TR7 power, but surprisingly most were sold off to private buyers." This expectation is supported by what happened to the 25 or so cars of the failed O-series engine TR7 development programme, which were either scrapped or converted to TR8s before sale.

It is also the case that the 400 or so Fixed Head Coupe TR8s (approx. 150 ACT and 250 TCT chassis numbered cars) were sold off when that did not become a catalogued item (only the convertible, DHC version was catalogued). However these were needed for its homologation approval (granted 1 April 1978), and would have been covered by the same FIA requirement to be "meant for the normal sale". And while, at most, only 150 of these had been built at the time the approval was granted, it is also noted (in relation to the approval of the Vauxhall Chevette HS) that "due to the recognised difficulties of producing 400 cars down a modern production line, there had arisen an understanding that some leeway was allowed. For instance, if the 400 cars were built within a few months of the homologation date then the car would normally be allowed through."

While the number of cars required by the FIA to homologate a modification to a Group 4 car does not appear to be known, 50 cars are said to have been required for some similar modifications of the era, (Note: There is speculation that the requirement was 10 percent of the number needed for full homologation into Group 4; however, while that would have been 50 prior to 1976, it would only have been 40 thereafter.) such as the 1977 RS1800 X0 version, the Vauxhall Chevette HSR, and the Porsche 924 Carrera GTS. The role of the TR7 Sprints in this process is shown by the series of 6 photographs of one of the press garage cars (later registered as SJW 530S), taken on 1 November 1977, listed in the BMIHT Film and Picture Library as "TR7 Sprint Homologation". (Note: Given the few cars available at the time, these pictures can only have applied to either the homologation of a Group 4 modification or variant needing 50, or a new Group 4 homologation needing 400, but possibly allowed on a promise to manufacture the remainder within a few months. However, given also the sell-off of the TR7 Sprints that began within days of these pictures being taken, and the approval of the 16-valve head for the second time, as Group 4 variant 8 in amendment 10 to the TR7's form of recognition, it appears that the latter option is unlikely.)

It may also be noted that production of the TR7 Sprints began almost immediately after the homologation of the 5-speed TR7 for group 3 (in January 1977), when the specification of the 16-valve cars needed to re-homologate the head would have become clear, and that production basically stopped soon after 50 cars had been produced around the end of June 1977 (only 3 cars produced after that, probably all for specific purposes). It may also be noted that in mid November 1977 (9th to 23rd), just after the homologation pictures had been taken, the 30 SJW cars, supposed to have gone to the press garage, were transferred out of the keeping Sales and Marketing Longbridge, into that of the Power Train Division, which is identified in the process of the disposal of similar cars.

== Cancellation ==
It has been an issue of conjecture and debate if the TR7 Sprint ever really was intended for full series production as a catalogued model and why so few were made if it was. There had been significant speculation regarding the possible production of a 16-valve version of the TR7 from the outset. This was because the two engines used the same block, etc., so it seemed an obvious development. It is even claimed that it was one of the most anticipated sports cars of the 1970s.

The usual reason given for the cancellation of the TR7 Sprint is the 17-week-long strike at the BL Speke plant, where the TR7 and at least some of the TR7 Sprints were manufactured, starting at the beginning of November 1977. This resulted in the closure of the plant in May 1978, the move of production to Canley, Coventry, and, it is said, led to the cancellation of the TR7 Sprint. However, this industrial action is itself blamed, ultimately, on the "replacement of the aristocratic Lord Stokes with South African businessman Michael Edwardes" as managing director, announced in Nov 1977. These events therefore occur well after the main production ceased in early July 1977, and probably too late to be responsible for the change of status indicated by the start of the transfer of the press garage cars out of the keeping of Sales and Marketing, on 9 November 1977. Another reason given for the cancellation is that "the Marketing department killed it because the 0-60 acceleration times were identical to the 2V engine with little increase in top speed." However, this lack of significant difference is disputed, and no reason is given for why any TR7 Sprints should have been produced if Sales and Marketing did not want it.

The only apparent reason given that is attributed to a credible source within BL (Mike Dale, then BL US VP of Sales and Marketing) links the cancellation of the TR7 Sprint model to the cancellation of the cost-reduced, fuel injected version of the 16-valve slant-four engine. This was being developed because, unlike the TR7 and TR8, the Sprint's 16 valve engine was not suitable for the vehicle emissions control equipment needed for the US market, which was the main target market for the TR7 and 8. This engine was originally being developed for the Triumph SD2, which was cancelled in 1975. Moreover, the cost-reduction programme appears to have been cancelled in 1975, before SD2 became part of the Triumph-Morris TM1 programme, which was also cancelled later in 1975, and the fuel injection system did not make it to Dolomite Sprint production, which continued until 1980. This cancellation with SD2 in 1975 is supported by the 1975 Ryder report, which followed the bankruptcy of BLMC, provided the nearly £3 billion pound rescue plan for BL through ownership by the National Enterprise Board, and identified BL’s critical need for rationalization of the range of competing models and engine types produced by BLMC. It is also noted that "at the time the [TR7] Sprint was aborted, a fuel injected version of the 16-valve engine was under development for it".

Whereas, the start of production of the TR7 Sprint does follow immediately after the homologation of the 5-speed gearbox and the HD axle (for the group 3 TR7) in January 1977, which the extra power of the 16-valve engine needed: it is at this point that the specification of the car needed to re-homologate the Group 4 TR7 under the new rules became certain. The end of main production, in early July 1977, also follows soon after production reaches 50 cars with build records, which appears to be the number required by the FIA for such evolutions. Further, their transfer out of the keeping of sales and marketing follows only 8 days after the TR7 Sprint Homologation pictures were apparently taken, which, presumably coincides with their inspection prior to granting the second approval of the 16-valve head.

Hence, the anecdotal references to "production" of the TR7 Sprint may - as the term production is used with several other homologation specials, like the Vauxhall Chevette HSR and Porsche 924 Carrera GTS - refer to the few needed for this process of homologating such a modification.

When the TR7 Sprint programme ended, and the cars became redundant, "most were sold off to private buyers" and some went into BL's management car plan and were leased to BL employees, and a number are known to still exist.

== See also ==
- Triumph TR7
- Triumph TR8
- Harris Mann
- Triumph Slant-4 engine
- Spen King
