= Harry Webster =

British automotive engineer (1917–2007)

- Born: 27 May 1917; Coventry, England
- Died: 6 February 2007 (aged 89); Kenilworth, Warwickshire, England

Henry George Webster, CBE (27 May 1917 – 6 February 2007) was a British automotive engineer. He is best known for his work at the Triumph Motor Company throughout the 1950s and 1960s.

== Career ==
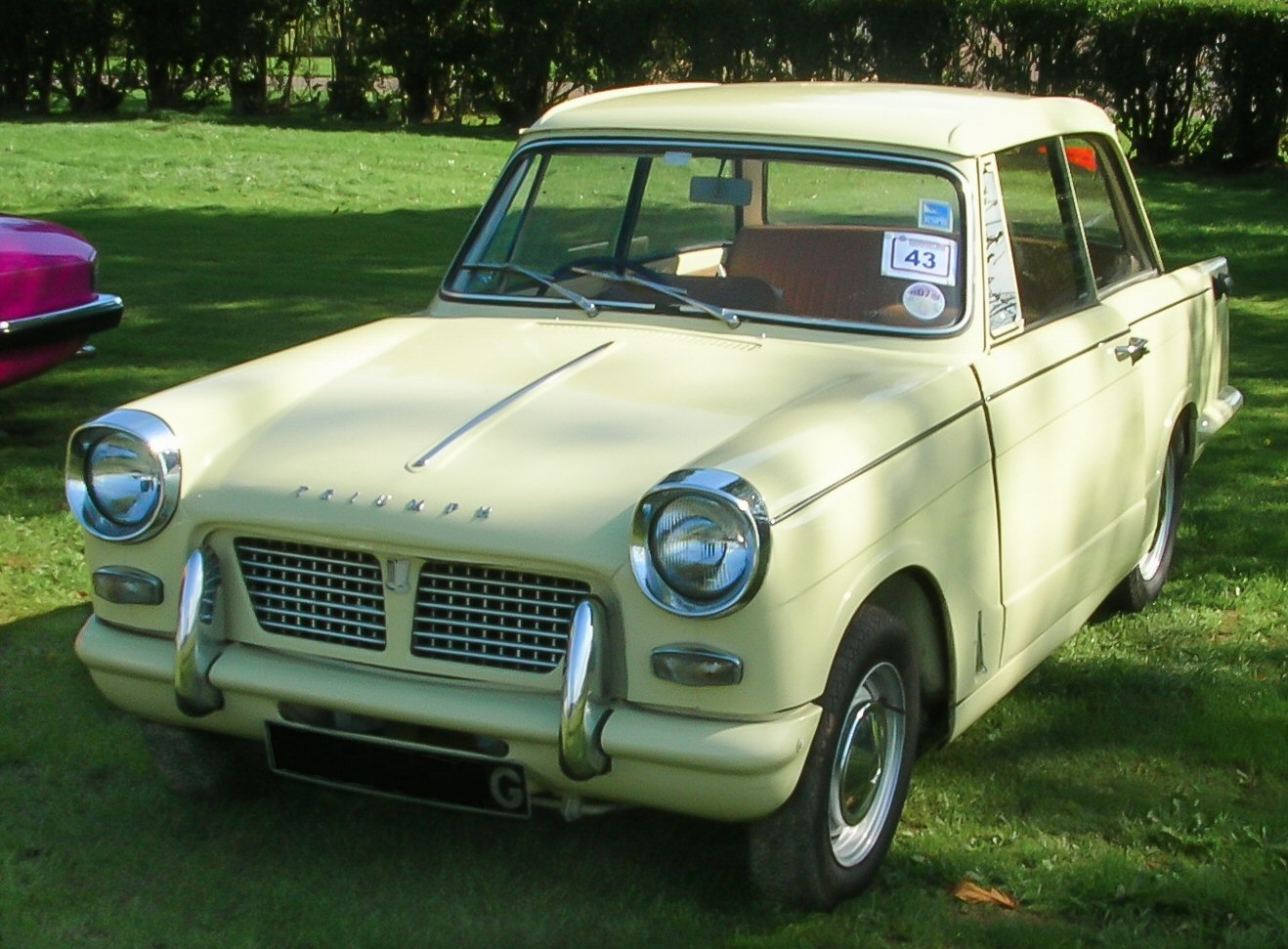
1968 Triumph Herald

Harry Webster was born in Coventry in 1917, and educated at Welshpool County School and Coventry Technical College. He stayed in Coventry to join the Standard Motor Company in 1932 as an apprentice, spending six years in Standard's aircraft engineering operation during the Second World War, after which he returned to the car chassis design department in Coventry. Following Standard's acquisition of the Triumph Motor Company in 1946, Webster's design and chassis engineering abilities helped to revive the Triumph marque through the 1950s. In 1957 Webster became Triumph's director of engineering, and in 1967 he was appointed chief executive engineer at Leyland Motors, which had by then acquired Standard-Triumph. In 1968, following the merger of British Motor Holdings and Leyland Motors to form British Leyland Motor Corporation (BLMC) he succeeded Alec Issigonis as BLMC's technical director.

Webster worked on Triumph's TR series of sports cars, which included the TR2, TR3, TR4, and TR5, and brought in Italian stylist Giovanni Michelotti to work with him on the TR4, Herald, Vitesse, Spitfire, 2000, Stag. 1300 fwd (which included the new “All Systems Go” dial designed by Webster) and 1500 fwd which eventually resulted in the Dolomite range of cars including the Sprint.

After resigning from BLMC in 1974, he joined Leamington Spa-based brake and clutch manufacturer Automotive Products as group technical director. He retired in 1982.

== Later years ==
Webster lived in Kenilworth, where he had moved in the late 1950s, until his death in 2007.

== Honours ==
In 1974 Webster was appointed Commander of the Most Excellent Order of the British Empire (CBE) for his contribution to the British motor industry.

== Related links ==
- Harry Webster at Find a Grave
- Adolphus, David Traver (23 September 2018). "Henry George Webster". www.hemmings.com.
- Robson, Graham (12 February 2007). "Harry Webster". Standard Motor Club. Archived from the original on 21 July 2011.
