= Triumph Stag =

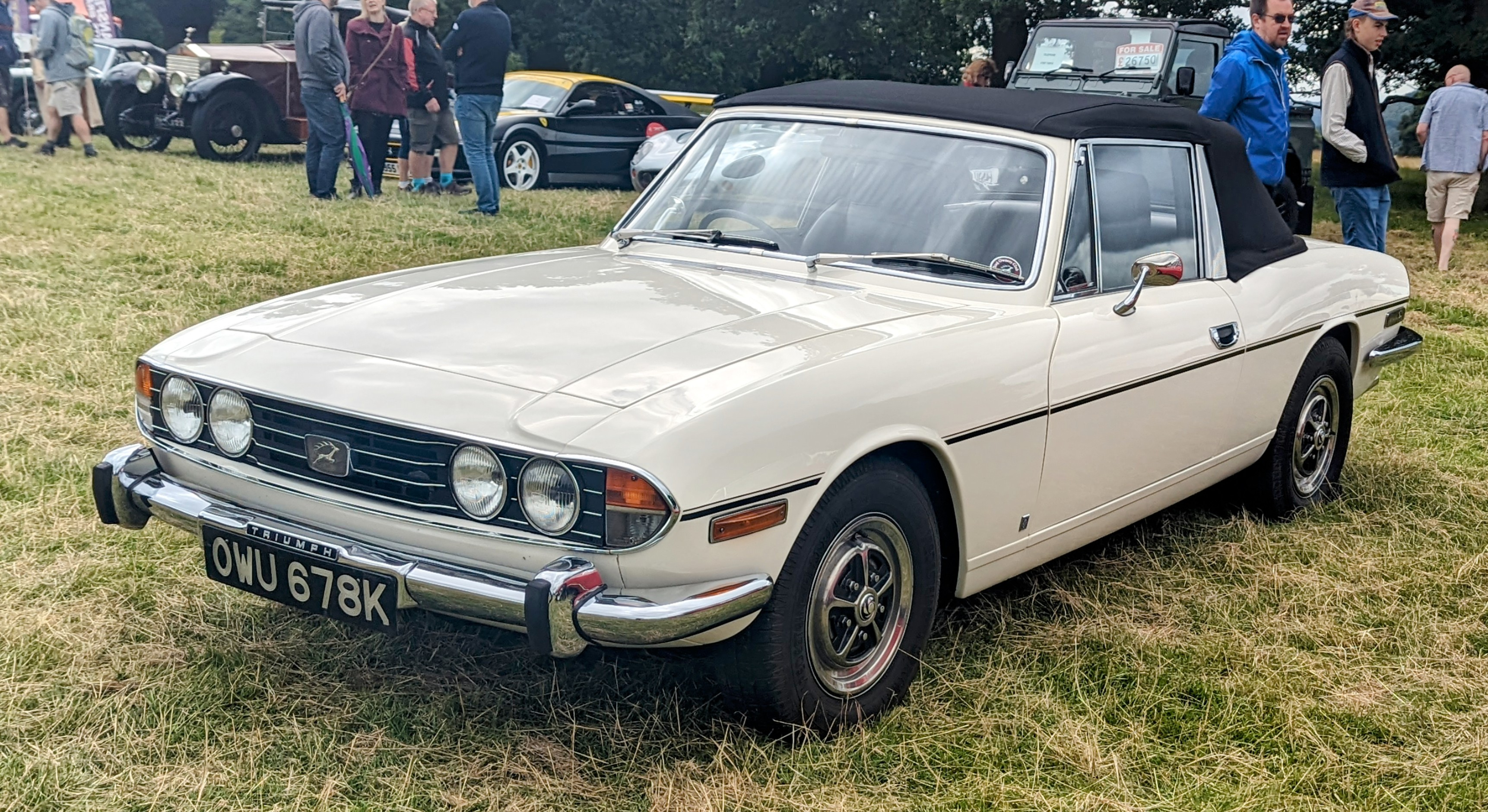
- 1972 Triumph Stag

Overview
- Manufacturer: Triumph Motor Company
- Production: 1970–1977; 25,939 made
- Assembly: United Kingdom: Canley, Coventry
- Designer: Giovanni Michelotti

Body and chassis
- Class: Sports tourer
- Layout: Front-engine, rear-wheel-drive
- Related: Triumph TR250; Triumph 2000

Powertrain
- Engine: 2,997 cc (182.9 cu in) Triumph V8
- Transmission: 4-speed manual (with optional overdrive); 3-speed Borg-Warner Type 35 automatic

Dimensions
- Wheelbase: 100 in (2,540 mm)
- Length: 173 in (4,394 mm)
- Width: 63.5 in (1,613 mm)
- Height: 49.5 in (1,257 mm) (hardtop)
- Kerb weight: 2,800 lb (1,300 kg)

The Triumph Stag is a 2+2 sports tourer which was sold between 1970 and 1977 by the British Triumph Motor Company, styled by Italian designer Giovanni Michelotti.

== Design and styling ==
Envisioned as a luxury sports car , the Stag was designed to compete directly with the Mercedes-Benz SL class models . All Stags were four-seater convertible coupés, but for structural rigidity – and to meet proposed American rollover standards of the time – the Stag required a B-pillar "roll bar" hoop connected to the windscreen frame by a T-bar. A body-colour removable hard top with defrost wires on the rear window, full headliner and lever operated quarter windows was a popular factory option.

The car started as a styling experiment cut and shaped from a 1963–64 pre-production 2000 saloon, also styled by Giovanni Michelotti. His agreement was, if Harry Webster, Director of Engineering at Triumph, liked the design, Triumph could use the prototype as the basis for a new model. Webster loved the design and took the prototype back to England. The result, a two-door drophead (convertible), had little in common with the styling of its progenitor 2000, but retained the suspension and drive line. Triumph liked the Michelotti design so much that they propagated the styling lines of the Stag into the new T2000/T2500 Mark II saloon and estate model lines of the 1970s.

Triumph gave new projects four-letter development code names (e.g. Bomb for the Spitfire) and the Stag was the only Triumph to take its development code name into production.

== Engineering ==
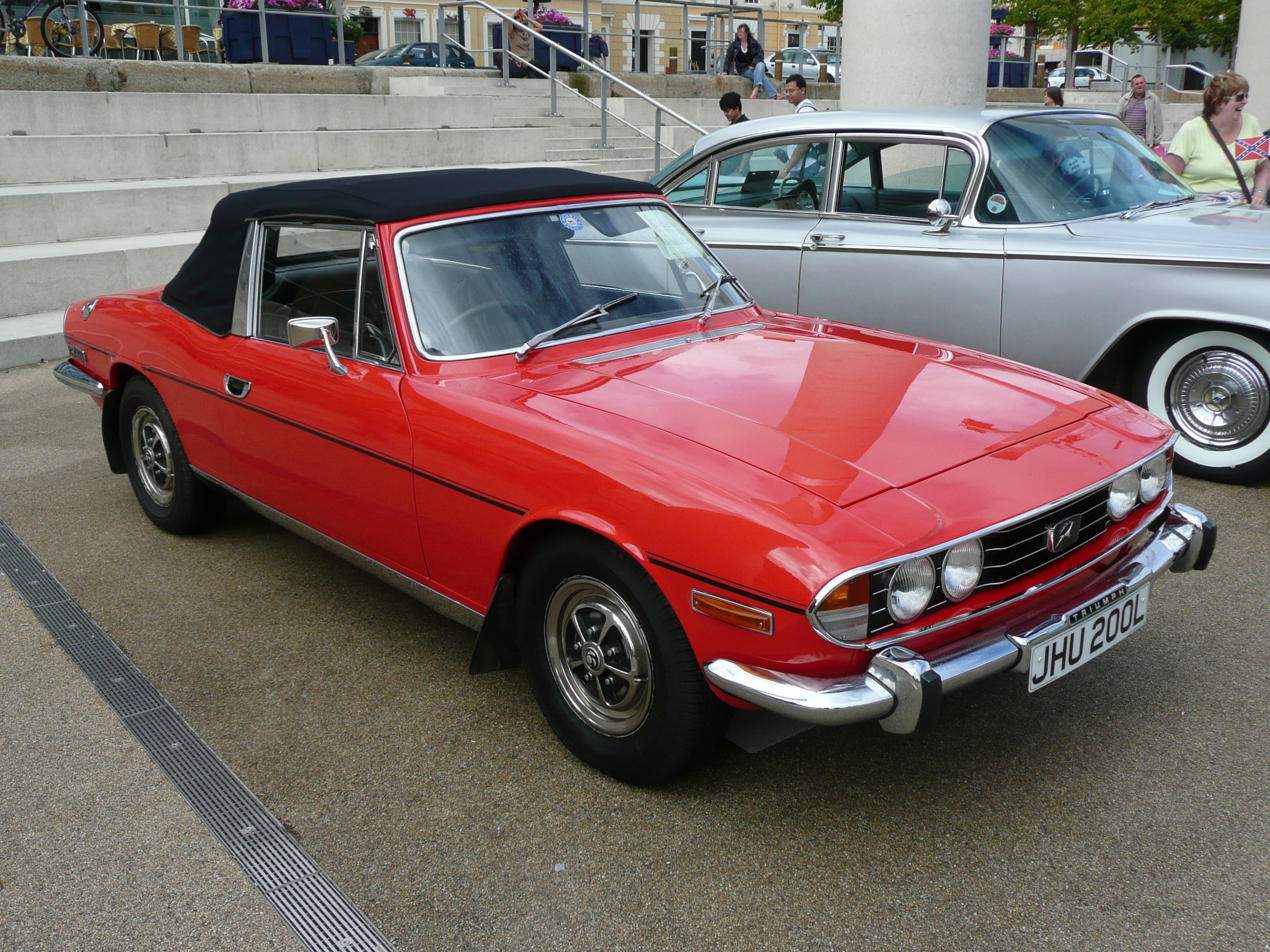
1972 Stag with Rostyle wheel trims, retrofitted 1976 stainless steel sill panels

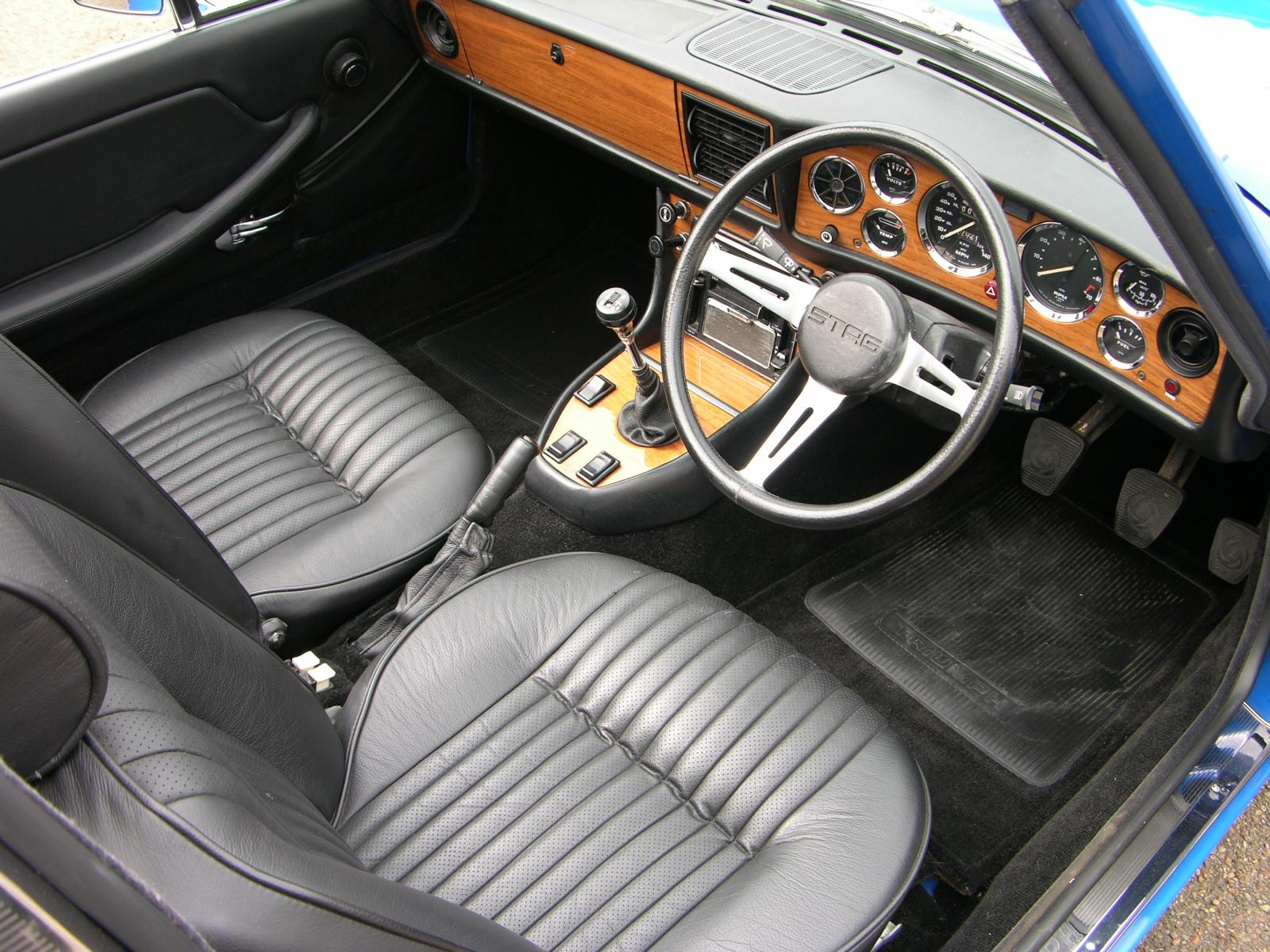
1974 Stag interior

The initial Stag design used the saloon's 2.0-litre six cylinder engine which was intended to be uprated to 2.5-litres for production cars, but Webster intended the Stag, large saloons and estate cars to use a new Triumph-designed overhead cam (OHC) 2.5-litre fuel injected (PI) V8. In 1968, under the direction of Engineering Director Harry Webster and his successor as Chief Engineer, Spen King, the new 2.5 PI V8 was enlarged to 2,997 cc (3 L; 183 cu in) to increase the power available. To meet emission standards in the US, a key target market, the troublesome mechanical fuel injection was dropped in favour of dual Zenith-Stromberg 175 CDSE carburettors. In common with several other manufacturers, a key aim of Triumph's engineering strategy at the time was to create a family of in-line and V engines of different size around a common crankshaft. The various configurations Triumph envisaged would enable the production of four-, six-, and eight-cylinder power plants of capacity between 1.5 and 4 litres, sharing many parts, and hence offering economies of manufacturing scale and of mechanic training. A number of iterations of Triumph's design went into production, notably a 2.0-litre slant four-cylinder engine used in the later Dolomite and TR7, and a variant manufactured by StanPart that was initially used in the Saab 99. In 1968 the Saab variant became the first of these engines to be fitted to a production car, followed by the Stag V8 in 1970. Sometimes described as two four-cylinder engines siamesed together, it is more strictly correct to say the four-cylinder versions were the left half of a Stag engine.

It has sometimes been alleged Triumph was instructed to use the all-aluminium Rover V8, originally designed by Buick and under development by Rover at the time, but claimed it would not "fit". Installation testing of both the Triumph V8 and the Rover V8 was carried out in May/June 1967, the conclusion being that the engine was too tall and that front structure changes would be necessary. It was decided not to further hold up Stag development and to proceed with the Triumph V8 unit. Although later enthusiasts have shown that it can be made to fit the space, the decision to go with the Triumph V8 was probably more due to the Buick's lack of British sales experience, the fact that there was not a manual gearbox offered by Rover at the time, and that the different torque characteristics and weight would have entailed substantial re-engineering of the Stag when it was already behind schedule. Such a substitution would also have required a rethinking of the wider engineering strategy, both of which were important "fit" considerations beyond the comparatively trivial matter of the relative dimensions of the two engines. Furthermore, Rover, also owned by Leyland Motor Corporation at the time, could not necessarily have supplied the numbers of V8 engines required to match the anticipated production of the Stag.

As in the 2000 model line, unitary construction was employed, as was fully independent suspension: MacPherson struts in front, semi-trailing arms at the rear. Braking was by front disc and rear drum brakes, while steering was power-assisted rack and pinion.

== Production ==
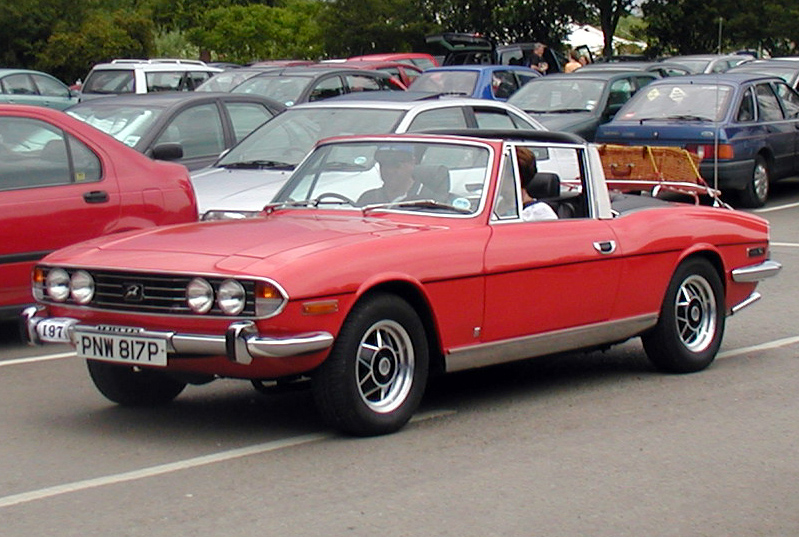
1975 Triumph Stag with alloy wheels

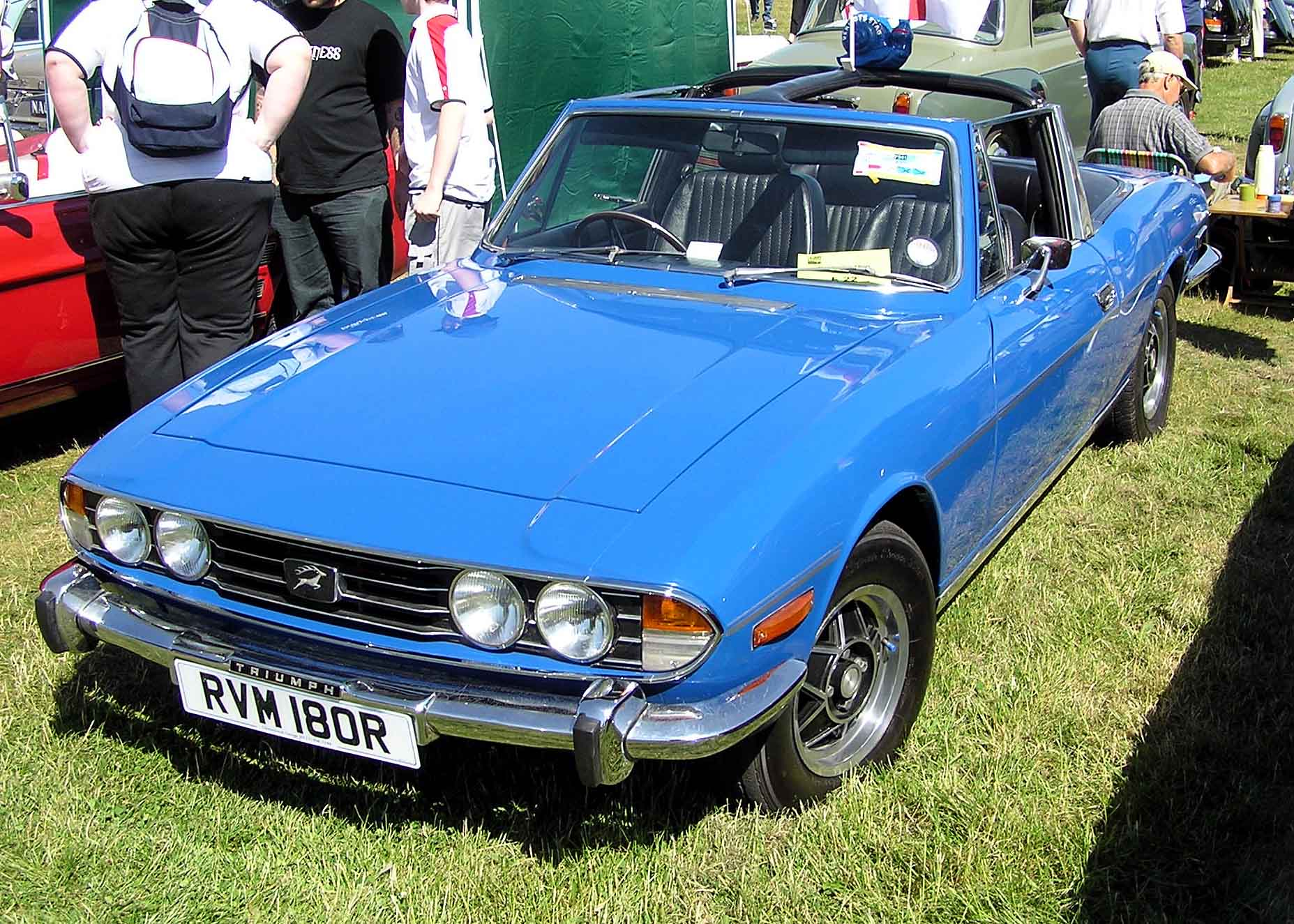
1977 Triumph Stag Mark 2

The car was launched nearly two years late in June 1970, to a warm welcome at the international auto shows. In the UK the Stag was an immediate success for Triumph with a 12-month waiting list rapidly being established and cars changing hands at well above list price, but when it was released into the US, its main target market, it rapidly acquired a reputation for mechanical unreliability, usually in the form of overheating. These problems arose from a variety of causes.

First, the collaboration with Saab on the related slant 4 engine gave rise to design features being carried over to the V8, some of them questionable from an engineering perspective. For example, because the Saab 99 placed the engine back to front in the engine bay, the traditional mounting of the water pump on the front face was not possible. The answer for the Saab engine was to place the water pump within the top of the engine block, which is a higher position than is usual. Due to the use of a common machining line for both the slant 4 and the V8, this positioning was copied to the V8. If the engine became hot in traffic, and coolant escaped from the cooling system via the expansion bottle, the volume of fluid left when the engine cooled down again fell. If this was not noticed and it continued to occur, the coolant level would eventually fall below that of the pump, which would be unable to circulate the coolant. Overheating would result, often accompanied by pump failure. Water pump failures also sometimes occurred due to poorly-hardened drive gears, which wore out prematurely and stopped the water pump. Once this key component of the cooling system had failed, overheating ensued.

A second cause of engine trouble was the lack of attention to corrosion inhibitor in the coolant. The block was made from iron and the heads from aluminium, a combination that required the use of corrosion-inhibiting antifreeze all year round. This point was not widely appreciated by owners or by the dealer network supporting them. Consequently, engines were affected by electrolytic corrosion, and white alloy oxide sludge collected in radiator cores, reducing radiator efficiency and again causing overheating. The result was head gasket failure due to cylinder head heat distortion, a very expensive repair. Owners would usually get their repaired cars back with the radiator still clogged, leading to repeat failures.

A third cause of trouble was the engine's use of long, simplex roller link chains, which would first stretch and then often fail inside fewer than 25,000 miles (40,200 km), resulting in expensive damage. Even before failing, a stretched timing chain would skip links and cause valves to lift and fall in the wrong sequence, so that valves hit pistons and damaged both. This fault may have been worsened by poor quality chains.

Another problem with the cylinder heads was said to be the arrangement of cylinder head fixing studs, half of which were vertical and the other half of which were at an angle. Anecdotally, this arrangement was used to reduce production costs, as the cylinder head mounting studs and bolt were all accessible with the rocker covers fitted. This allowed the factory to assemble the cylinder head completely before fitting to the engine. This arrangement worked well enough on the 4-cylinder engines, but in the V8 the angled and vertical studs, when heated and cooled, expanded and contracted in different directions sufficiently to give rise to sideways forces that caused warping of the engine block. The problem was made worse by the engine's propensity to overheat.

Finally, although pre-production engines were built meticulously, those fitted to production cars were not subject to the same careful quality control. Engines are still being discovered with casting sand and core wire inside, blocking the coolant passages and causing overheating.

This combination of manufacturing and maintenance flaws led to some engine failures in the UK but in the US the situation was exacerbated by the need to fit low compression pistons to comply with California's low octane petrol requirements, and the associated advance in ignition timing to meet that country's continually changing emission regulations. The result was that the engine developed greater heat and, when automatic transmission and air conditioning were fitted, the engine cooling ability was overly compromised. Although US cars were fitted with engine cowls to try to compensate, all too often the result of a freeway tailback was an overheating engine. Time magazine rated the Triumph Stag as one of the 50 worst cars ever made.

British Leyland never materially re-engineered the Triumph 3.0 litre OHC V8 to address these issues, other than introducing a domed piston to aid combustion and a high-pressure cooling system that boiled over at a higher temperature. Another problem was that the Stag was always a relatively rare car. British Leyland had around 2,500 UK dealers when the Stag was on sale and a total of around 19,000 were sold in the UK over seven years. Thus the average dealer sold only seven or eight Stags during the car's production run, or roughly one car per year. This meant that few dealers saw defective Stags often enough to recognise and diagnose the cause of the various problems.

A number of owners replaced the troublesome engine with units from other cars, such as the Rover V8, or the Triumph 2.5-litre engine around which the Stag was originally designed. The number of such conversions undertaken is not known, but as at September 2024, fewer than 6% of surviving Stags known to DVLA have a 3.5-litre engine or larger, according to www.howmanyleft.com., while 92% have a 3-litre engine. It is not clear how many of these are original 3-litre Stag engines and how many are Ford Essex units. It is thought by the relevant owners club that the Ford engine powers fewer Stags than does the Rover V8.

The last production Stag (BOL88V) is kept at the Heritage Motor Centre, Warwickshire.

== Mark I and Mark II variants ==
Perhaps because the American market never took to the Stag, only 25,877 cars were produced between 1970 and 1977. Of this number, 6,780 were export models, of which 2,871 went to the United States. As the Stag was originally destined for large sales in the United States, Triumph utilised the 'model year' method of altering specification details, with each new model year bringing cosmetic changes. For the 1973 model year a number of engineering changes were also made and, although Triumph only ever referred to Stag as one model, since production ceased, enthusiasts have introduced the terms 'Mk 1' and 'Mk 2' to refer to cars produced before and after the 1973 model year change. Model year batches or 'sanctions' are generally identified through differing production numbering sequences, thus, as the first 1973 model year car was chassis numbered 20001, those cars with chassis numbers before 20001 are often referred to as Mk 1 cars and those cars with chassis numbers after 20001 are often referred to as Mk 2 cars.

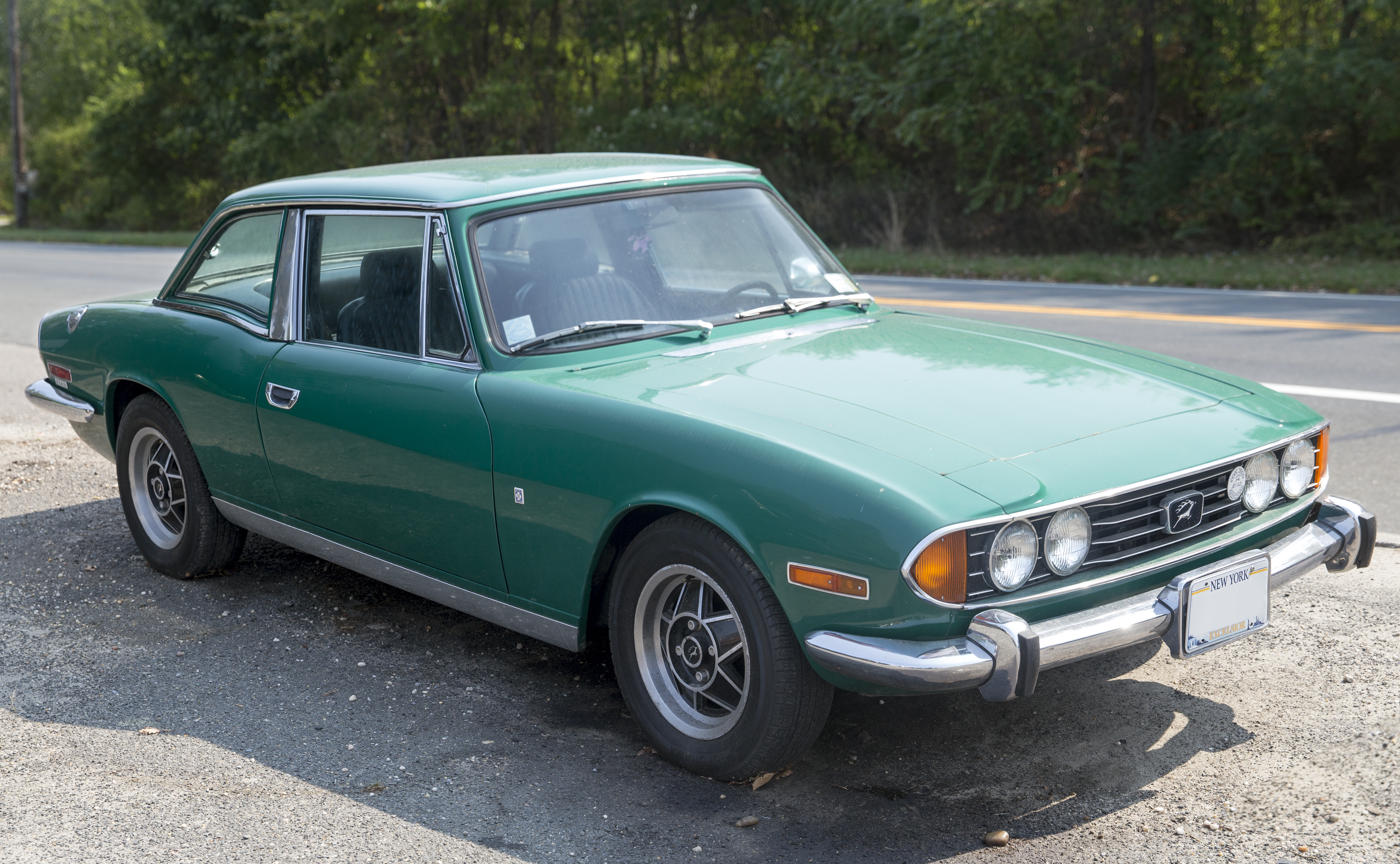
1973 US-market Mark 2 Stag with factory hardtop installed

When introduced in 1973, the most notable differentiating feature between Mark 1 and Mark 2 Stags was the addition of twin coachlines to the body. At this time the sills and tail panel colour was also altered from body colour to low-gloss black but as the tail panel was altered back again for the 1976 model year, it is not an ideal indicator of the difference between Mk 1 / Mk 2 cars. Inside, Mk 2 cars had a slightly different warning light cluster and the instrument dial needles point up rather than down. They also had a single courtesy light in the T-bar rather than lights at the top of each B-post, the steering wheel was smaller, the seats were upholstered in a different way such that it was possible to fit a simple head restraint (which was initially an optional extra but became a standard fitment later on) and the map-reading light was deleted from the door of the glove box and replaced with an internal light. Very early production cars had a three-quarter window in the soft top, which was deleted during the 1972 model year as it tended to become trapped and then split when stowed. A higher-pressure cooling system was introduced during the 1972 model year. For the 1976 model year the cars returned to having body-colour sills and tail panel, but a stainless steel sill cover, as fitted to all US Stags, was fitted over the sills for all 1976 and 1977 cars. Late Stags fitted with the slightly longer BW65 automatic transmission had a correspondingly shorter propshaft to compensate.

Cars for export markets such as the United States comprised unique combinations of features specifically required for compliance with various states' requirements, or simply for marketing purposes. Cars factory-designated as "Federal specification" included features such as side impact bars in the doors, Federal Department of Transportation compliant lighting, and anti-smog emissions equipment which was not generally found on vehicles for other markets.

Approximately half of the cars built were fitted with a Borg-Warner Type 35 3-speed automatic transmission, which on the last 3,800 vehicles produced gave way to a Type 65. The other choice was a derivative of the earlier Triumph TR2 manual gearbox which had been modified and improved over the years for use in the TR4/A/IRS/TR5/250/6. The first gear ratio was raised and needle roller bearings were used in place of the bronze bushings on the layshaft. Early 4-speed manual transmission models could be ordered with an A-type Laycock overdrive unit, later ones frequently came with a J-type Laycock unit. The overdrive option was often chosen as the engine RPM drops significantly with this option in 3rd and 4th (top) gears, and it was included as a standard fitment for all manual cars from 1973.

Other than the choice of transmissions, there were very few factory-installed options. On early cars, buyers could choose to have the car fitted with just the soft-top, just the hard-top (with the hood stowage compartment empty), or with both. Later cars were supplied as either a 'soft top model' or with both roofs as a 'hard and soft top model'. Three wheel styles were offered. The standard fitment for non US-bound cars from 1970 to 1975 was steel wheels with Rostyle "tin-plate" trims. The wheels are secured with the usual four bolts, but the Rostyle trims have five false bolts. Standard fitment for the US for 1971 and 1972 model years was a 72-spoke wire spoke wheel which was specially designed for Stag. These were possibly available as factory fitments for other markets. For the 1973 model year in the US, five-spoke alloy wheels became the standard fitment and these were also available for other markets. For the 1976 model year, cars for all markets had the alloy wheels fitted as standard.

Electric windows, power steering and power-assisted brakes were standard with Delaney Gallay air conditioning being a factory fitted option. A range of aftermarket products including a luggage rack, uprated Koni shock absorbers, floor mats, and Lucas Square Eight fog lamps were available as dealer-installed optional accessories. Part numbers were allocated for leather upholstery but its actual existence is doubtful as it was not included in either the sales brochures or the price lists and no surviving car is known to have original factory leather. Rather unusually for a 4-seat touring car, the parts catalogue included a sump protector plate that was never produced.

== Replacement ==
The Stag was never directly replaced. British Leyland planned an equivalent model to follow the Stag in the form of a derivative of the Triumph TR7 sports car which was codenamed the Lynx. The Lynx used the TR7 platform with an extra 12 inches in the wheelbase to accommodate a rear seat and had fastback coupe bodywork. Power came from a 3.5-litre Rover V8 and the gearbox and rear axle were lifted from the Rover SD1. The Lynx was very close to production being scheduled for launch in 1978. However the sudden closure of the Triumph factory in Speke, Liverpool, where the car was to be built and new policies implemented by BL's new chief executive, Michael Edwardes, led to the Lynx's cancellation.

== Unmade variants ==
Triumph planned a coupé version of the Stag to complement the open-top tourer, in the same manner as the smaller GT6 coupé was based on the Spitfire. In 1968, Michelotti converted his original 1966 styling concept Stag into his idea of a coupe version and, following further deliberations at Triumph, he was sent a prototype body shell for an 'improved' version to be manufactured. This second car took very clear styling cues from the GT6, including the shape of the rear windows and roofline and the provision of air vent 'gills' in the C-pillar. In 1970/71, Triumph built a one-off 'production' Stag coupé, called the Fastback, to Michelotti's design with minor detail differences to match the production Stag more closely. Although the design was considered successful and "more useful than an ordinary Stag", British Leyland did not continue with the project, reportedly because they feared the Stag fastback would take sales from other actual and planned vehicles in the BL range. The Triumph-built prototype survives.

A number of Stags were built with four-wheel drive using the Ferguson Formula developed by Ferguson Research and pioneered on the Jensen FF. One Stag was reportedly fitted with the FF system by Triumph itself during development, but was either scrapped or converted back to standard specification. Two more 4WD Stags were built in 1972 by FF Developments, a company separate from Ferguson that had licensed the technology for converting existing road cars. The cars (one with manual transmission, one with automatic) were commissioned by GKN for development and testing work. Both had automatic locking differentials actuated by a viscous coupling and the same Dunlop Maxaret mechanical anti-lock braking system as used in the Jensen. The cars differed visually from standard by having a broad bulge in the centre of the bonnet; the engine had to be mounted slightly higher in the engine bay to accommodate the drive to the front wheels. Both these cars survive.

A lightweight Stag was tested which was essentially a standard Stag with most of the sound-deadening material removed. This did not proceed. A 32-valve Stag V8 engine was considered, but no documentary or other trace of any actual engine having been built has come to light. Any such engine could not have used two Dolomite Sprint 16-valve heads because it would have required mirror-image heads on opposite sides. Otherwise, the second camshaft, above the opposite bank of cylinders, would have emerged at the wrong end of the engine.

FF Developments also converted a number of Triumph 2000s (saloons and estates) to 4WD, including at least one 'Triumph 3000 estate' which received a Stag engine and gearbox as well as the Ferguson 4WD drivetrain.

== Classic status ==
The Triumph Stag has sizeable club and owner support and a number of specialist suppliers. According to the main UK enthusiast club approximately 8,500 Stags are believed to survive in the United Kingdom. According to DVLA data in Q4 2022, 8,409 UK cars survive, either taxed or under SORN.

== Notable appearances ==
- In 1971's Straw Dogs, an early pre-production Stag is Dustin Hoffman's main transport.

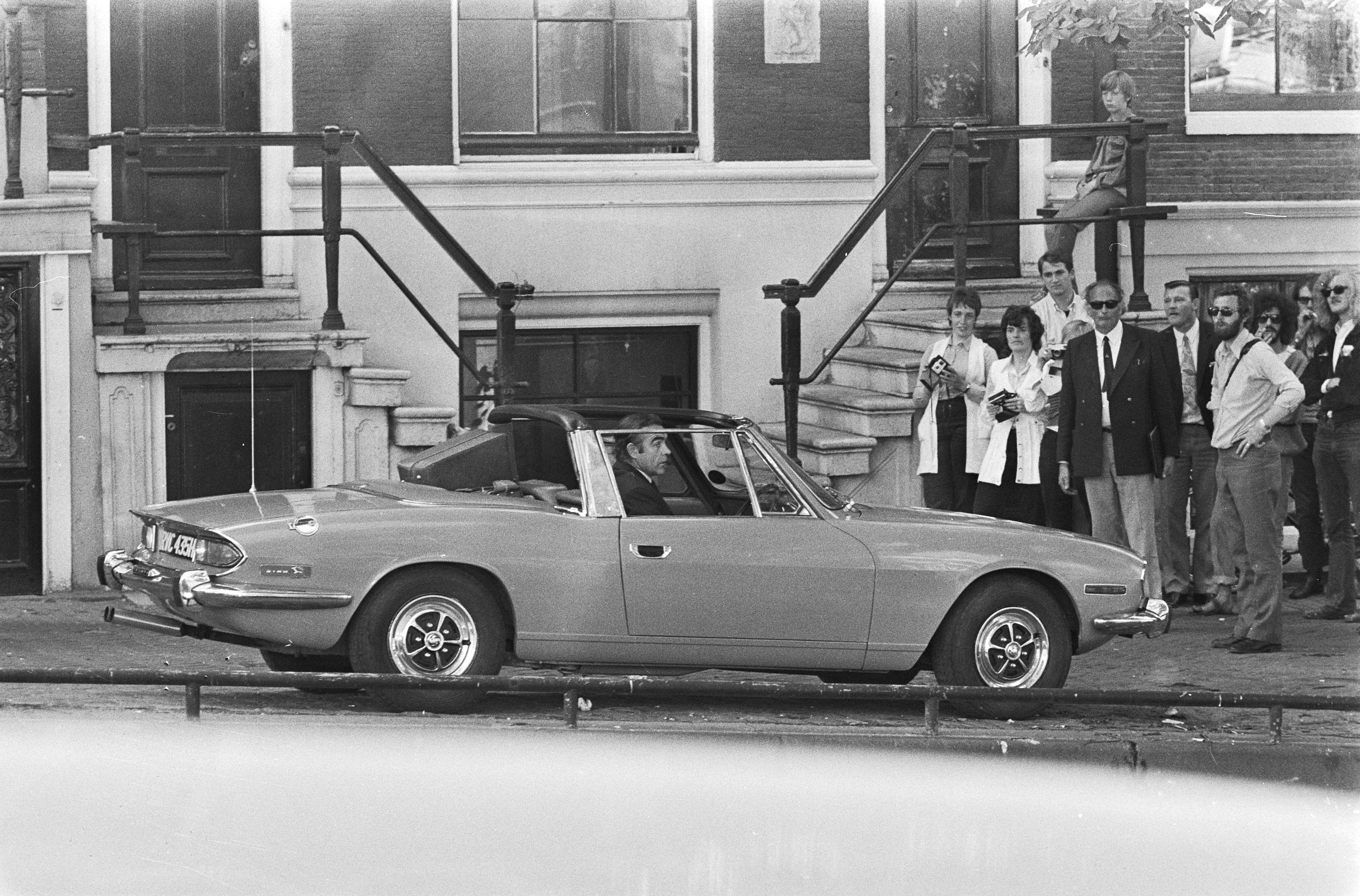
Sean Connery in a Mk1 Stag in Diamonds Are Forever

- In the James Bond film Diamonds Are Forever, Bond commandeers a Saffron Yellow 1970 Stag from a diamond smuggler.
- The 1978–1979 UK TV series Hazell featured a 1975 Mk2 Stag, originally green, but later repainted red.
- A 1973 Stag is driven by several characters in the 1985 movie My Beautiful Laundrette.
- In the 1981–1991 BBC/Australian TV series Bergerac, a yellow Stag is used by Bergerac's ex-wife Deborah.
- In the 1998 film, Dad Savage, a Carmine Red 1977 Stag is used as an intended getaway vehicle.
- In the 2000–2001 BBC TV series, Second Sight, DCI Ross Tanner (Clive Owen) drives a Sapphire Blue Stag.
- In the BBC series New Tricks, retired Detective Sergeant Gerry Standing drives a British racing green 1974 Stag that occasionally gives him trouble.
- In the 2018 BBC TV series A Very English Scandal, Jeremy Thorpe (Hugh Grant) drives a white Triumph Stag.
- In 2021, the Stag plays the main role in Amazon Original Modern Love throughout the first episode of series 2: "On a serpentine road, with the top down".
- In 2022 red Triumph Stag UVW456R had key role in McDonald & Dodds Series 3 episode 1 on ITV https://www.itv.com/watch/mcdonald-and-dodds/2a7401/2a7401a0006
- In the final The Grand Tour special "One For The Road", released on 13 September 2024, James May drove a Stag across Zimbabwe and parts of Botswana. Of the cars featured in the special, the Stag was the only car not to suffer any mechanical issues.
