= Triumph I6 =

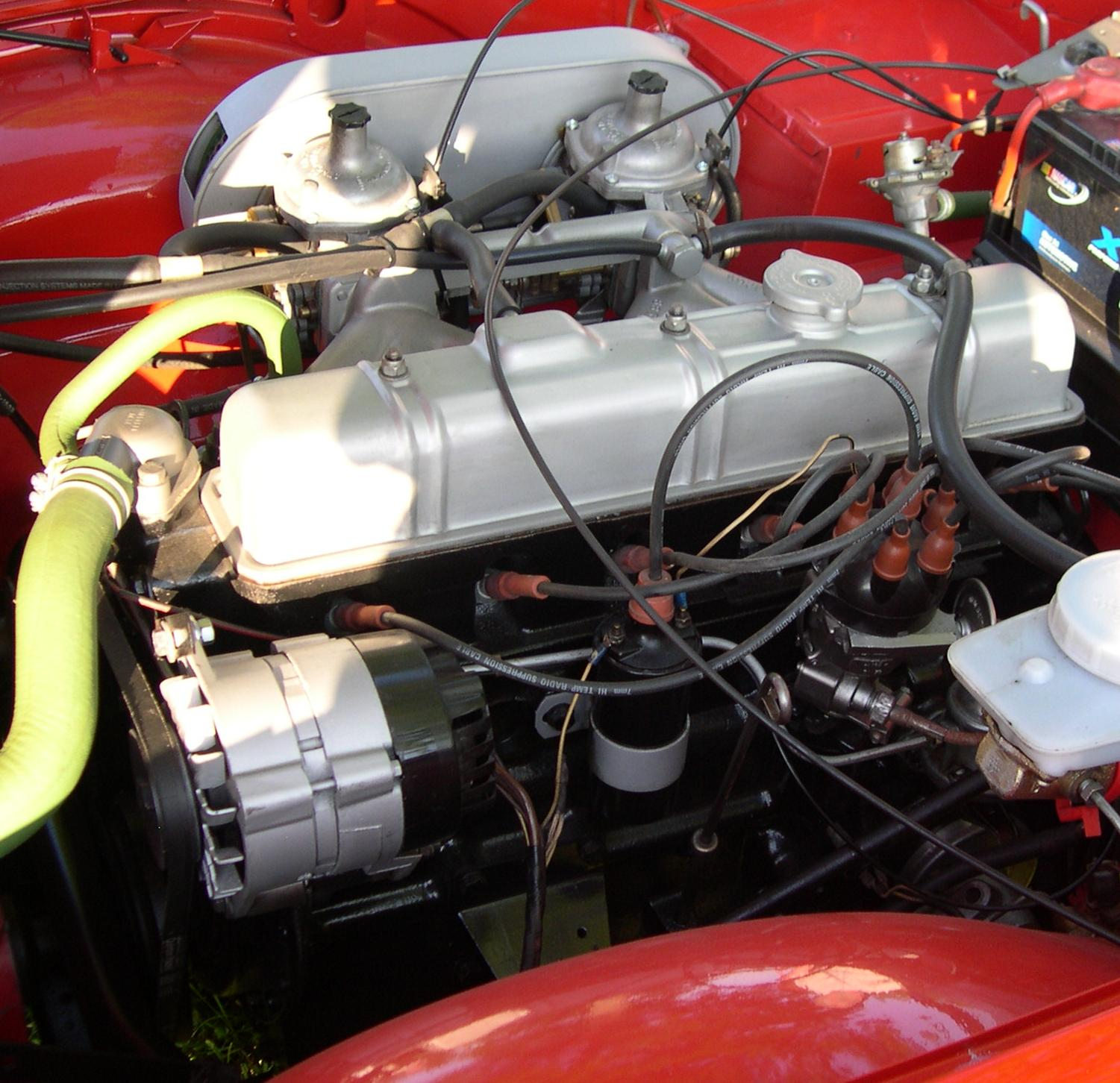
- Triumph I6 in a Triumph TR6

Overview
- Manufacturer: Standard Triumph; Leyland Motors; British Leyland; TVR
- Also called: Triumph Six Cylinder
- Production: 1960–1977

Layout
- Configuration: Naturally aspirated Straight-6
- Cylinder block material: Cast iron

Chronology
- Successor: Leyland PE166 engine

The Triumph Six Cylinder or Triumph I6 engine is a cast-iron overhead valve straight-six engine produced by Standard Triumph. It is an evolution of the Standard Motor Company's inline-4 SC engine originally designed for the Standard Eight, with the addition of two cylinders and a larger displacement.

Introduced in their Standard Vanguard Six in 1960, it was used in a wide range of Triumph vehicles, including the Triumph Vitesse, the TR6, and the Triumph 2000

== Origin ==
=== Standard Six engine ===
The six cylinder engine was developed from the Standard SC four and was first used in 1960 in the Standard Vanguard Six, in which it had a 74.6 mm (2.9 in) bore and a 76 mm (3.0 in) stroke, giving a capacity of 1998 cc. It was also used in the Eight and the Ten.

The engine was next used in the Triumph Vitesse, a sports saloon based on the Herald, in 1962. In this application, the engine had a 66.75 mm (2.6 in) bore, reducing displacement to 1596 cc. The Vitesse was given the two-litre engine with the 74.6 mm bore in 1966.

The Triumph 2000 replaced the Vanguard Six in 1963 when Leyland discontinued the Standard marque. The two-litre six was later used in the Spitfire-based GT6 coupé from 1966 to 1974.

Beginning in 1967, the engine was used in the Triumph TR5 and TR250 sports cars, replacing the Standard inline-four engine used in TRs from the TR2 to the TR4A. For this application, the stroke was increased to 95 mm (3.7 in), giving 2498 cc. When equipped with the Lucas mechanical fuel injection system in the TR5, this new 2.5-litre version gave a claimed 150 bhp (112 kW; 152 PS) at 5500 rpm. When tested on dynamometers, 110 to 130bhp at the crankshaft is more usual, and may explain Triumph's decision to fit the TR7 with a 2-litre slant-four engine, whose power output and hence performance were in fact similar to those of the earlier and ostensibly more powerful engine. The TR250 was sold in the US with Stromberg carburettors to avoid the need for additional emissions control systems; this reduced the power to 105 bhp (78 kW; 106 PS) at 4500 rpm. The Triumph TR6, made from 1969 to 1975, used the TR5's engine, detuned to 125 bhp (93 kW; 127 PS) in 1973. with a 106 hp version of the TR250's engine in the United States.

The fuel-injected 2.5 litre engine became available in the 2000 unit body as the Triumph 2.5 PI in 1968; this was supplanted by the twin-carburettor 2500 TC in 1974. The 2000 and 2500 TC were discontinued in 1977.

Triumph I6
Sound clip of a 1998 cc Triumph 6 cylinder engine, as fitted to a 1969 Triumph Vitesse.

== Technical ==
A partial chart of Triumph engine numbers is posted on the "Spitfire & GT6 magazine" site. However the capacity appears not to match the bore/stroke, or that published on other sites including the GT6 Ezine, hence the corrections in the tables below.

Engine Applications Chart

Engine No. Prefix	Capacity	Car
HB	1596 cc	Vitesse 6
HC	1998 cc	Vitesse 2 Litre
KC	1998 cc	GT6 Mk1/2
KD	1998 cc	GT6 Mk1/2 (Anti Smog) (US?)
KE	1998 cc	GT6 Mk3
KF	1998 cc	GT6 Mk3 (US)
KG	1998 cc	GT6 Mk3 (Sweden)
MB	1998 cc	2000 Mk1
MB	1998 cc	2000 Mk1
MG, MM, MN	2498 cc	2500
ME, ML	1998 cc	2000 Mk2
CC	2498 cc	TR250 & TR6
CF	2498 cc	TR6
CP, CR	2498 cc	TR6 (injection) and TR5PI

Factory Quoted Power Chart

Model	Quoted power at rpm	Quoted torque at rpm	Capacity
Triumph TR5	150 bhp (112 kW; 152 PS) at 5500	164 lb⋅ft (222 N⋅m) at 3500	2498 cc
Triumph TR250	104 bhp (78 kW; 105 PS) at 4500	143 lb⋅ft (194 N⋅m) at 3000	2498 cc
Triumph TR6 (69-72)	150 bhp (112 kW; 152 PS) at 5500	164 lb⋅ft (222 N⋅m) at 3500	2498 cc
Triumph TR6 (73...)	124 bhp (92 kW; 126 PS) at 5000	143 lb⋅ft (194 N⋅m) at 3500	2498 cc
Triumph TR6 (USA)	104 bhp (78 kW; 105 PS) at 4500	143 lb⋅ft (194 N⋅m) at 3000	2498 cc
Triumph 2.5 PI Mk1 & Mk2	132 bhp (98 kW; 134 PS) at 5500	153 lb⋅ft (207 N⋅m) at 2000	2498 cc
Triumph 2500 Mk2	99 bhp (74 kW; 100 PS) at 4700	133 lb⋅ft (180 N⋅m) at 3000	2498 cc
Triumph 2500 TC	106 bhp (79 kW; 107 PS) at 4700	139 lb⋅ft (188 N⋅m) at 3000	2498 cc
Triumph 2000 Mk1	90 bhp (67 kW; 91 PS) at 5000	117 lb⋅ft (159 N⋅m) at 2900	1998 cc
Triumph 2000 Mk2	84 bhp (63 kW; 85 PS) at 5000	100 lb⋅ft (140 N⋅m) at 2900	1998 cc
Triumph 2000 TC	91 bhp (68 kW; 92 PS) at 4750	110 lb⋅ft (150 N⋅m) at 3300	1998 cc
Triumph GT6 Mk1	95 bhp (71 kW; 96 PS) at 5000	117 lb⋅ft (159 N⋅m) at 3000	1998 cc
Triumph GT6 Mk2	104 bhp (78 kW; 105 PS) at 5300	117 lb⋅ft (159 N⋅m) at 3000	1998 cc
Triumph GT6+	95 bhp (71 kW; 96 PS) at 4700	117 lb⋅ft (159 N⋅m) at 3400	1998 cc
Triumph Vitesse 6	70 bhp (52 kW; 71 PS) at 5000	92 lb⋅ft (125 N⋅m) at 2800	1596 cc
Triumph Vitesse 2L	95 bhp (71 kW; 96 PS) at 5000	117 lb⋅ft (159 N⋅m) at 3000	1998 cc
Triumph Vitesse Mk2	104 bhp (78 kW; 105 PS) at 5300	117 lb⋅ft (159 N⋅m) at 3000	1998 cc

== Racing ==
Triumph raced Spitfires, and some early GT6 prototypes at Le Mans, with some good success, and later at Sebring but due to rule changes and the takeover by Leyland, this was not continued.

== Replacement ==
After Triumph, and later Rover, were absorbed into Leyland Motors in 1960, and 1967 respectively, work began on a successor to both the Triumph 2000 and the Rover P6 which would also use a new straight six engine design. The engine, known internally as the Leyland PE166 was originally intended to be a development of the Triumph I6, but ended up becoming an entirely new design, with almost no interchangeable parts with the original. The Rover SD1 was the only recipient of this engine in both 2.3L and 2.6L capacities.
