= Leyland PE166 engine =

Type of internal combustion engine

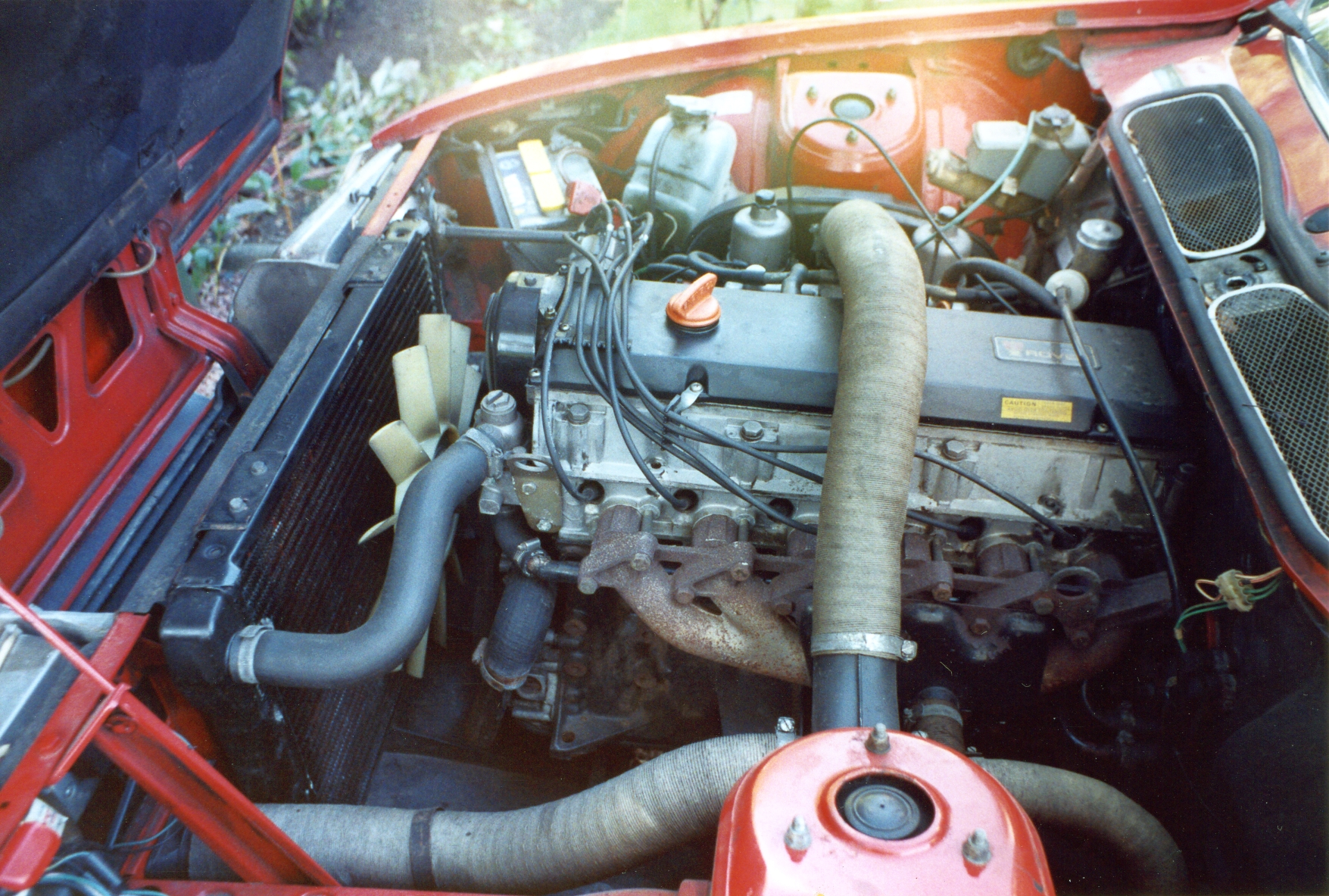
The 2.3-litre version installed in a Rover SD1

The Leyland PE166 (often referred to as the Rover-Triumph Straight Six) is a single overhead camshaft (SOHC) Straight-six engine developed by the Rover-Triumph division of British Leyland, and was exclusively used in the Rover SD1 (Rover 2300/Rover 2600) series of vehicles between 1977 and 1986.

== Technical detail ==
The engine was loosely based on the older Triumph I6 (which it was intended to replace), and was initially intended to share some internal components with that and the Dolomite Sprint engines. However, during development not a single component remained unchanged, the last link being severed when the conrod big-end was increased in diameter over the Dolomite Sprint equivalent. Both the capacity variants use an 81 mm (3.19 in) bore, with a 76 mm (2.99 in) or 84 mm (3.31 in) stroke giving 2.4 or 2.6 L (2,350 or 2,597 cc) capacity respectively. The 2350 cc engine produces a maximum power of 116 bhp (87 kW; 118 PS) at 5000 rpm and a maximum torque of 120 lb⋅ft (163 N⋅m) at 3500 rpm. The 2.6 L engine, meanwhile, produces a maximum power of 136 bhp (101 kW; 138 PS) at 5000 rpm and a maximum torque of 151 lb⋅ft (205 N⋅m) at 3750 rpm.

== Background ==
Following Leyland Motors' acquisition of both Standard-Triumph and the Rover Company in 1960 and 1967 (and the subsequent merger with the British Motor Corporation to create British Leyland a year later), a unified model policy was developed, with Rover and Triumph reorganized into the Specialist Division. Proposals were developed for replacing both the Triumph 2000 and the Rover P6 with a single product, codenamed SD1 (Specialist Division 1).
