= Triumph TR =

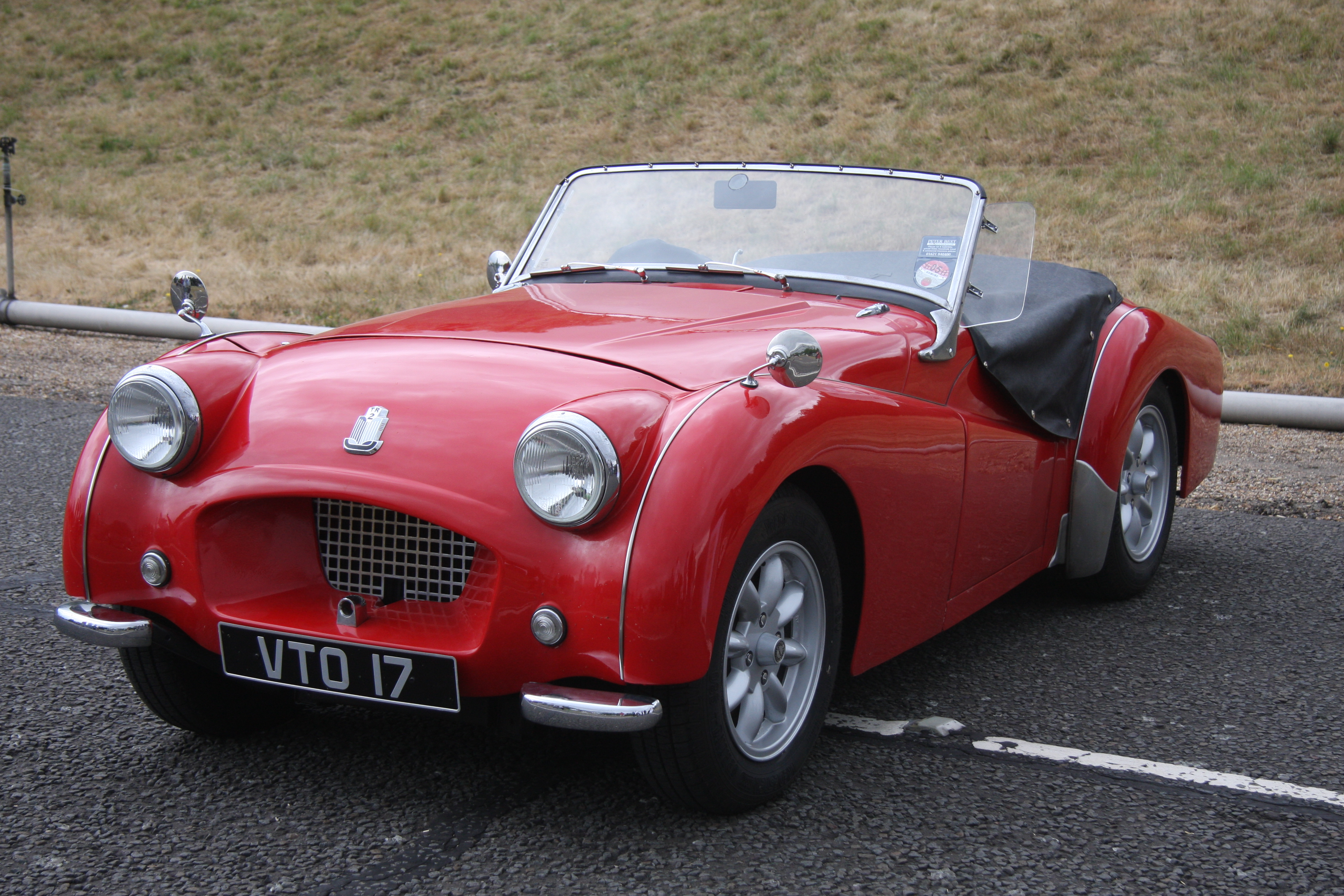
Triumph TR2, the first production car in the TR series

The Triumph TR range of cars was built between 1953 and 1981 by the Triumph Motor Company in the United Kingdom. Changes from the TR2 to the TR6 were mostly evolutionary, with a change from a live axle to independent rear suspension in 1965 and a change from a four-cylinder engine to a six-cylinder engine in 1967. An all-new TR7, with a unit body, an overhead camshaft four-cylinder engine, and a live rear axle, was introduced in late 1974. The TR8, a development of the TR7 with a Rover V8 engine, was introduced in 1979 and was sold alongside the TR7 until TR production ended.

== Concept car predecessors ==
=== TR-X ===
The Triumph TR-X, also known as the "Bullet", was the first Triumph car to use the "TR" label. It debuted at the Paris Auto Show in late 1950. Envisioned as a personal luxury car, it had envelope styling with aluminium body panels, spats over the rear wheels, and several electrically- or hydraulically operated convenience features. The TR-X used the Standard Vanguard's frame and engine, the Triumph Renown's suspension, and an electrically operated Laycock de Normanville overdrive. Its top speed was estimated to have been 90 mph (140 km/h).

The TR-X was discontinued after three prototypes had been built.

=== 20TS ===
Sir John Black, chairman of Standard-Triumph, was determined to have a sports car to compete with Morgan, which he had earlier tried to buy. Black ordered the design of a sports car using existing chassis, suspension, and engine, and inexpensive bodywork. Other design objectives were a price of approximately £500 and a top speed of at least 90 mph.

The resulting car, the Triumph 20TS, was shown in October 1952 at the London Motor Show. Public reception was mixed; the front styling and the potential for speed were praised, the cramped interior, stubby rear end, and lack of boot space were not. BRM test driver Ken Richardson was invited to drive the car; his low opinion of the car's handling and driveability resulted in him being hired to the development team for its replacement.

== Production TRs ==
=== TR2 and TR3 ===
The redesign and development of the 20TS led to a longer, roomier car with a larger boot, built on an all-new frame with revised suspension and brakes and an uprated engine. The resulting Triumph TR2 was shown in March 1953 at the Geneva Motor Show. The TR2 would form the basis of the evolution of the TR line up to the TR6.

The TR3, introduced in 1955, had a front grille and a more powerful engine. In October 1956, the front brakes of the TR3 were changed from 10 in drums to 11 in discs. A wider grill was also fitted around this time. The TR3 acquired external door handles and a lockable boot in 1957, and was available with a larger 2138 cc engine from 1959; the restyled car was unofficially known as the TR3A. A further development, with the larger engine as standard and with a fully synchromesh gearbox, was made available in 1962, the final year of TR3 production. This last version of the TR3 was unofficially known as the TR3B.

Triumph TR2 and TR3
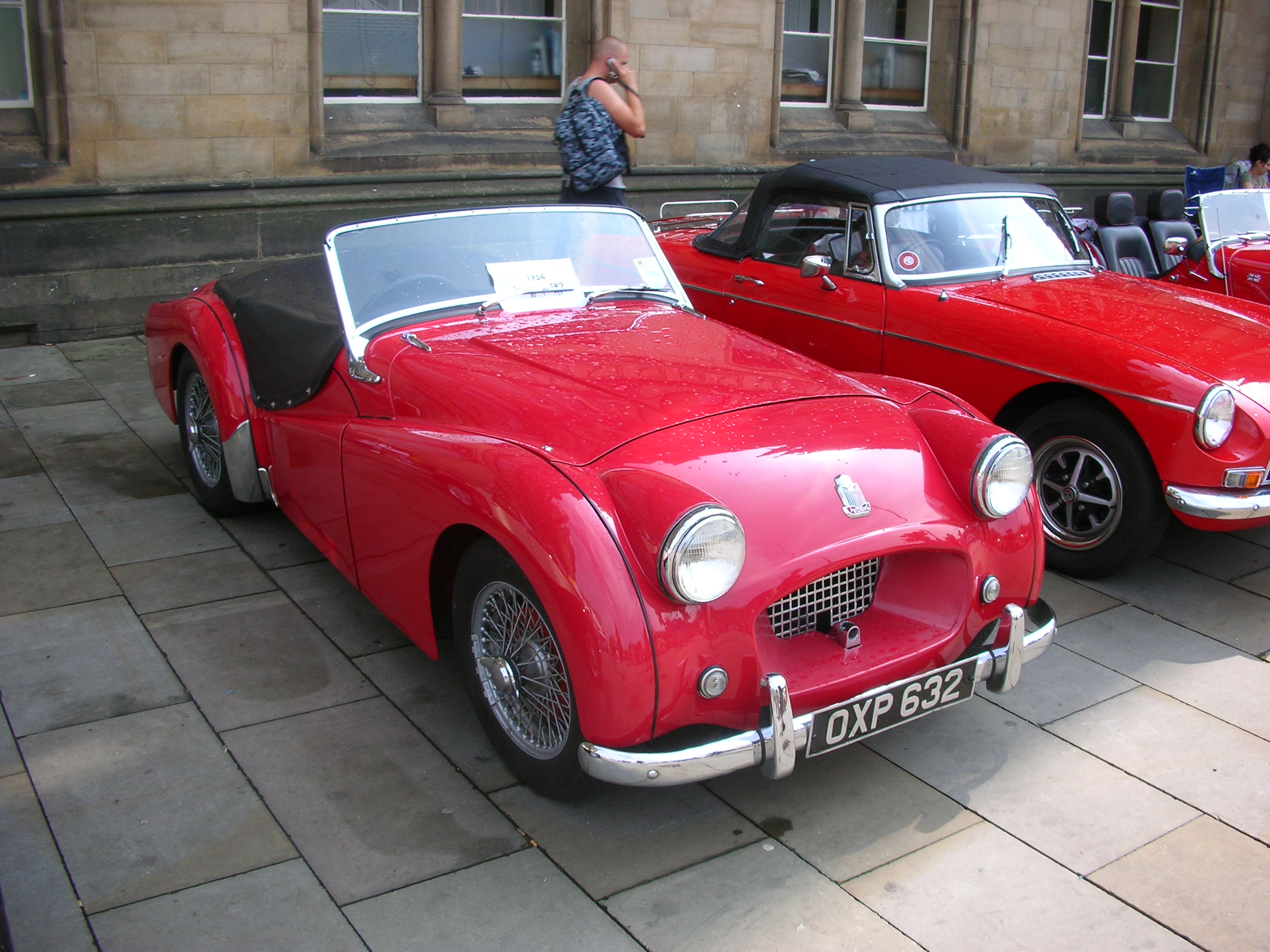
Triumph TR2

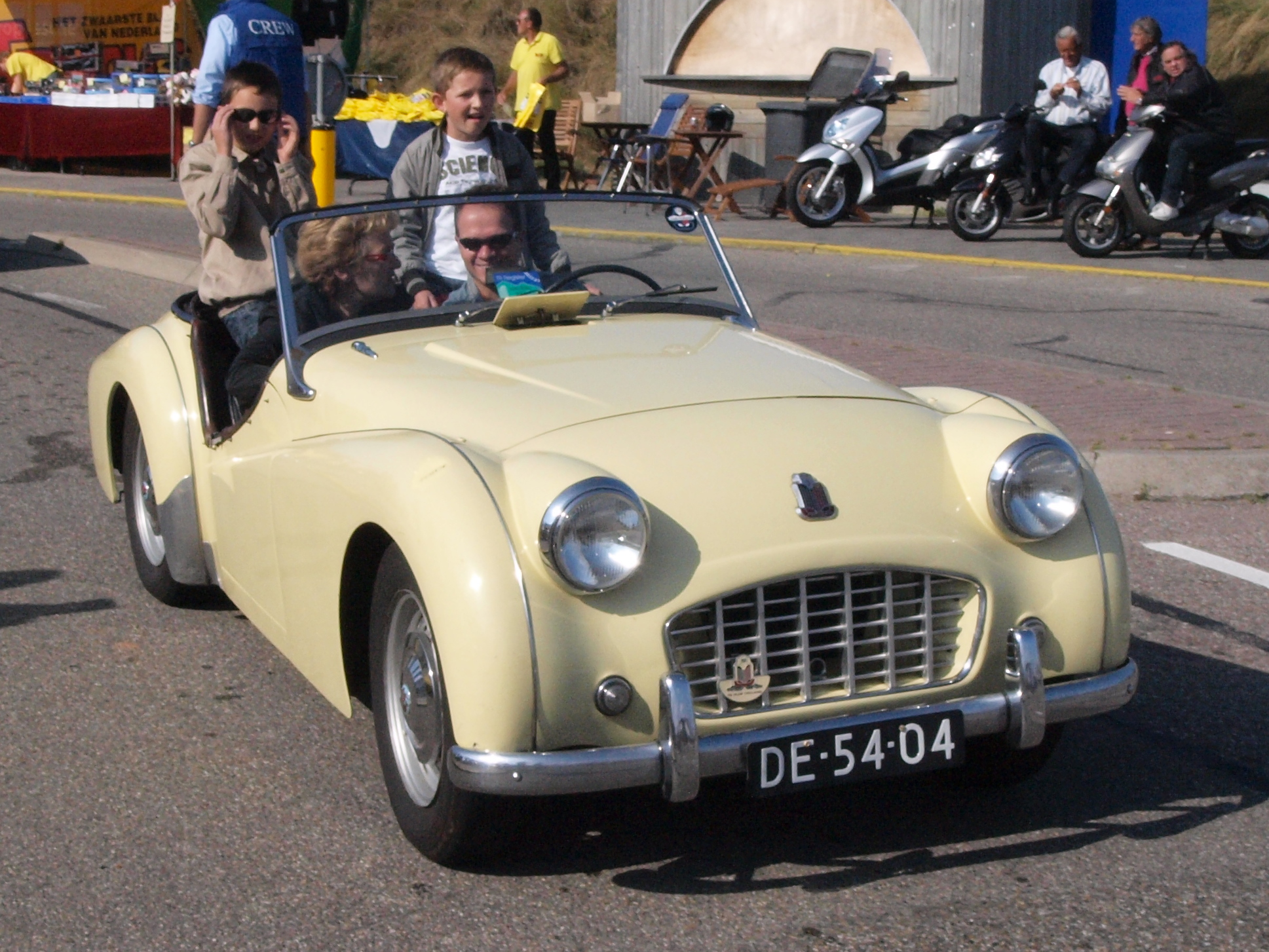
Triumph TR3 with narrow grille

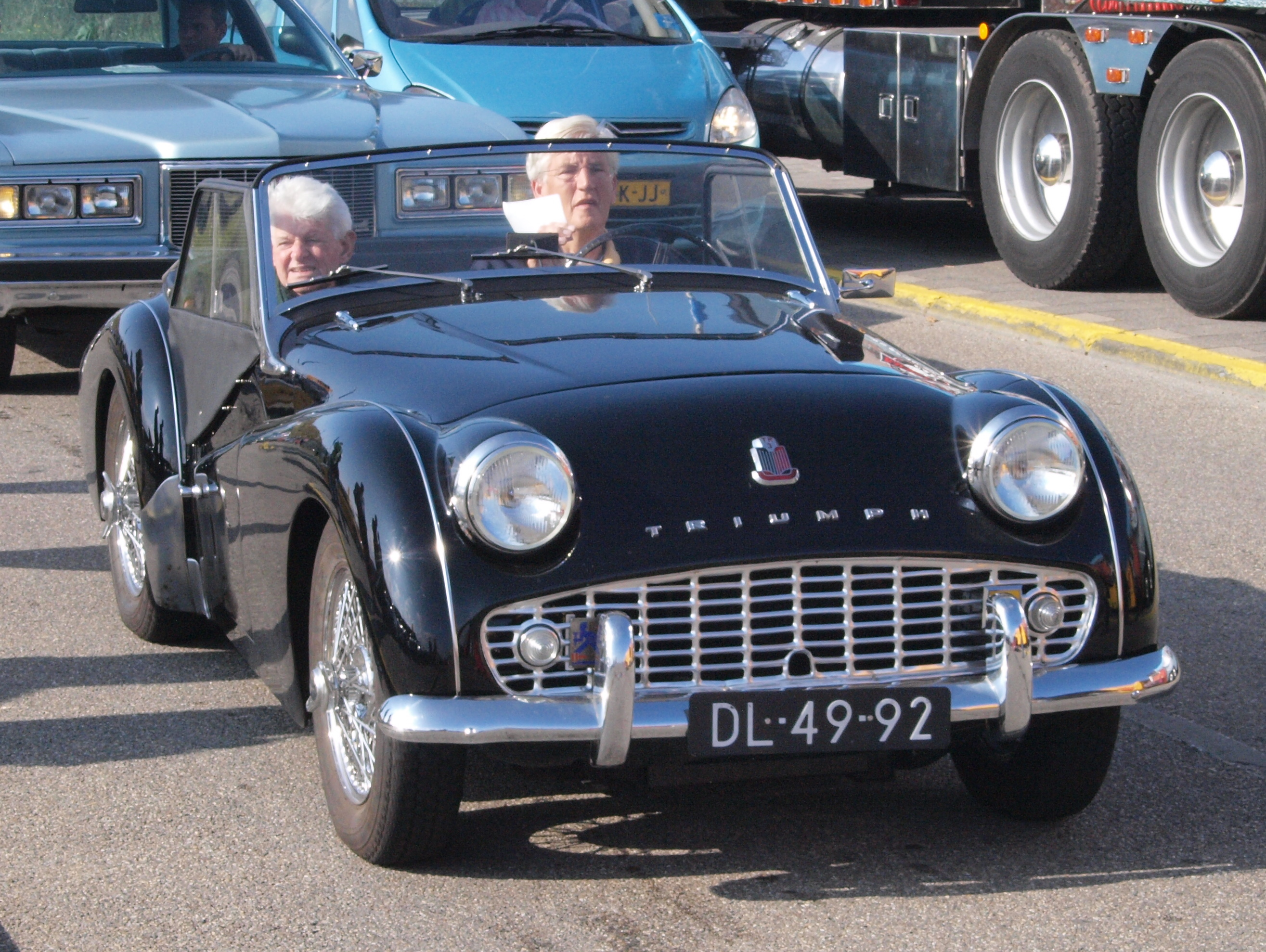
Later TR3 with wide grille

=== TR4, TR4A, TR5, TR250, and TR6 ===
Introduced in 1961, the TR4 had a completely new body designed by Giovanni Michelotti. The TR4 was upgraded to the TR4A in 1965 with the addition of independent rear suspension.

In 1967, the TR line was updated with servo-assisted brakes and a 2.5 L version of the straight-six engine that had been used in the Triumph 2000. Two different models were made: the TR250 with two Stromberg carburettors for the US market, and the TR5 with Lucas fuel injection for the rest of the world.

Both the TR250 and the TR5 were replaced by the TR6 in 1968, with the US version continuing with carburettors. The main difference between the TR6 and the TR5 it replaced was its styling. The front and rear ends of the car had been restyled by German coachbuilder Karmann, giving the car a more contemporary appearance. An anti-roll bar was added to the front suspension as well.

Triumph TR4, TR5, TR250, and TR6
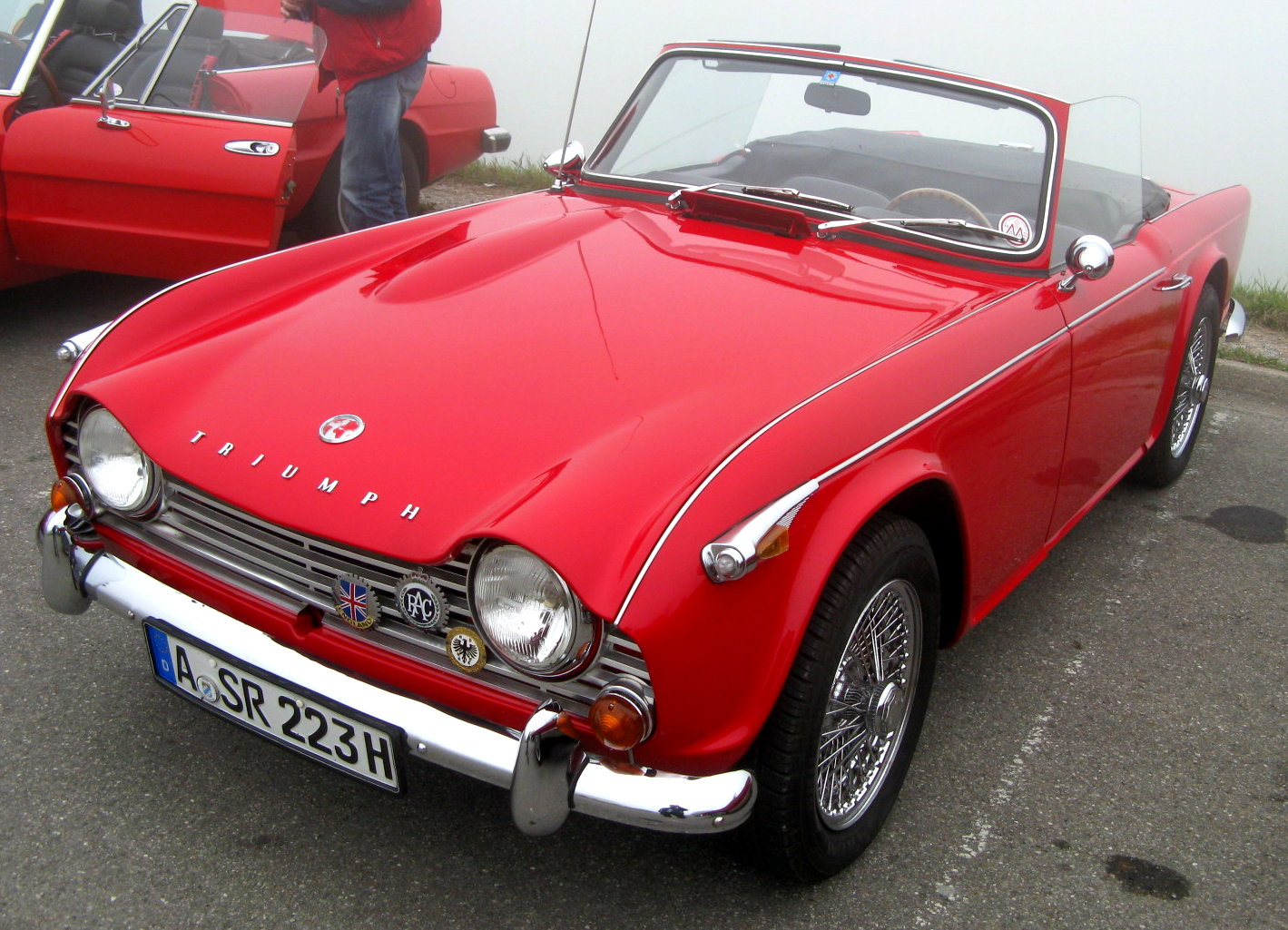
Michelotti-designed TR4A

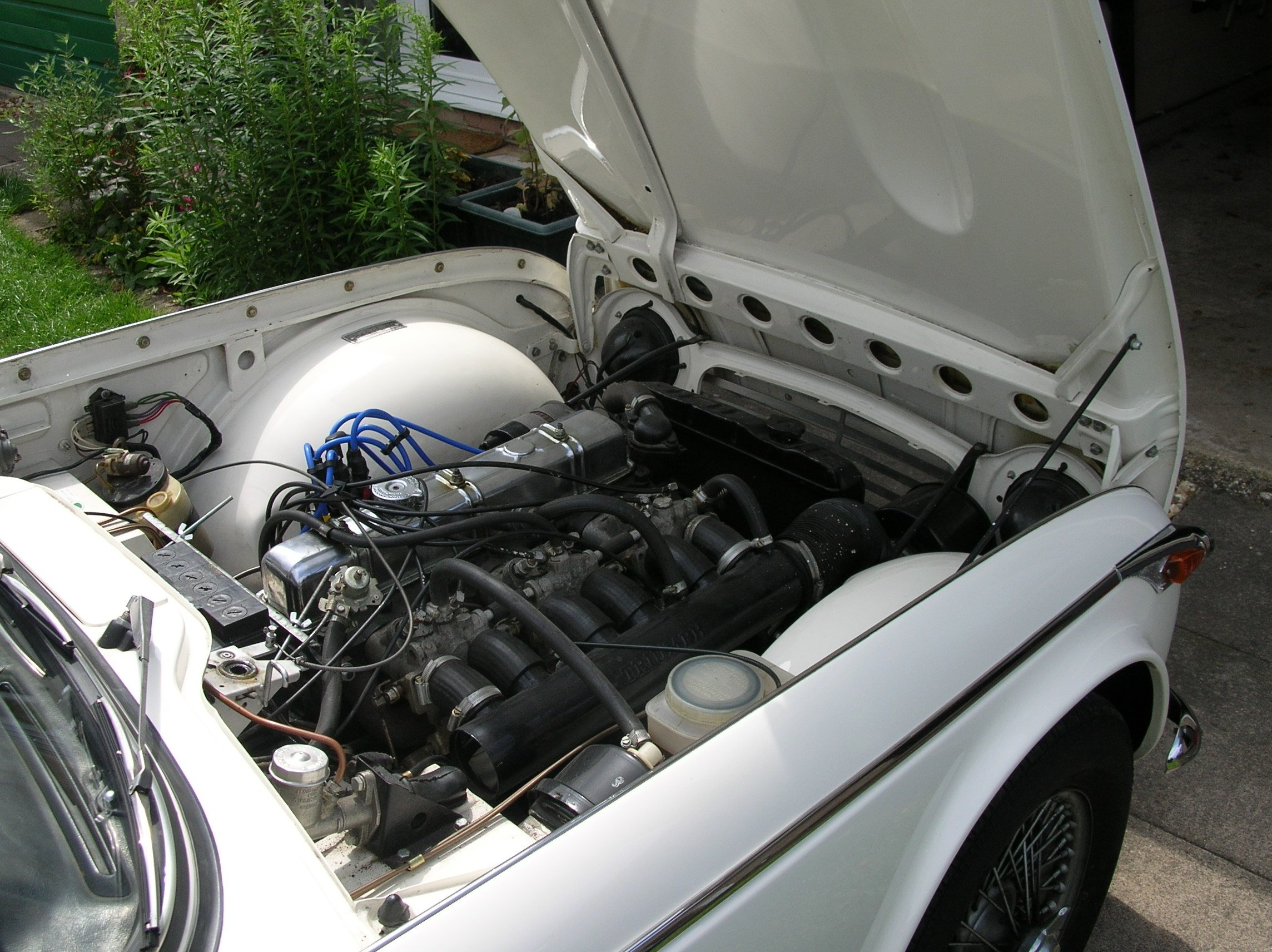
Triumph TR5 engine

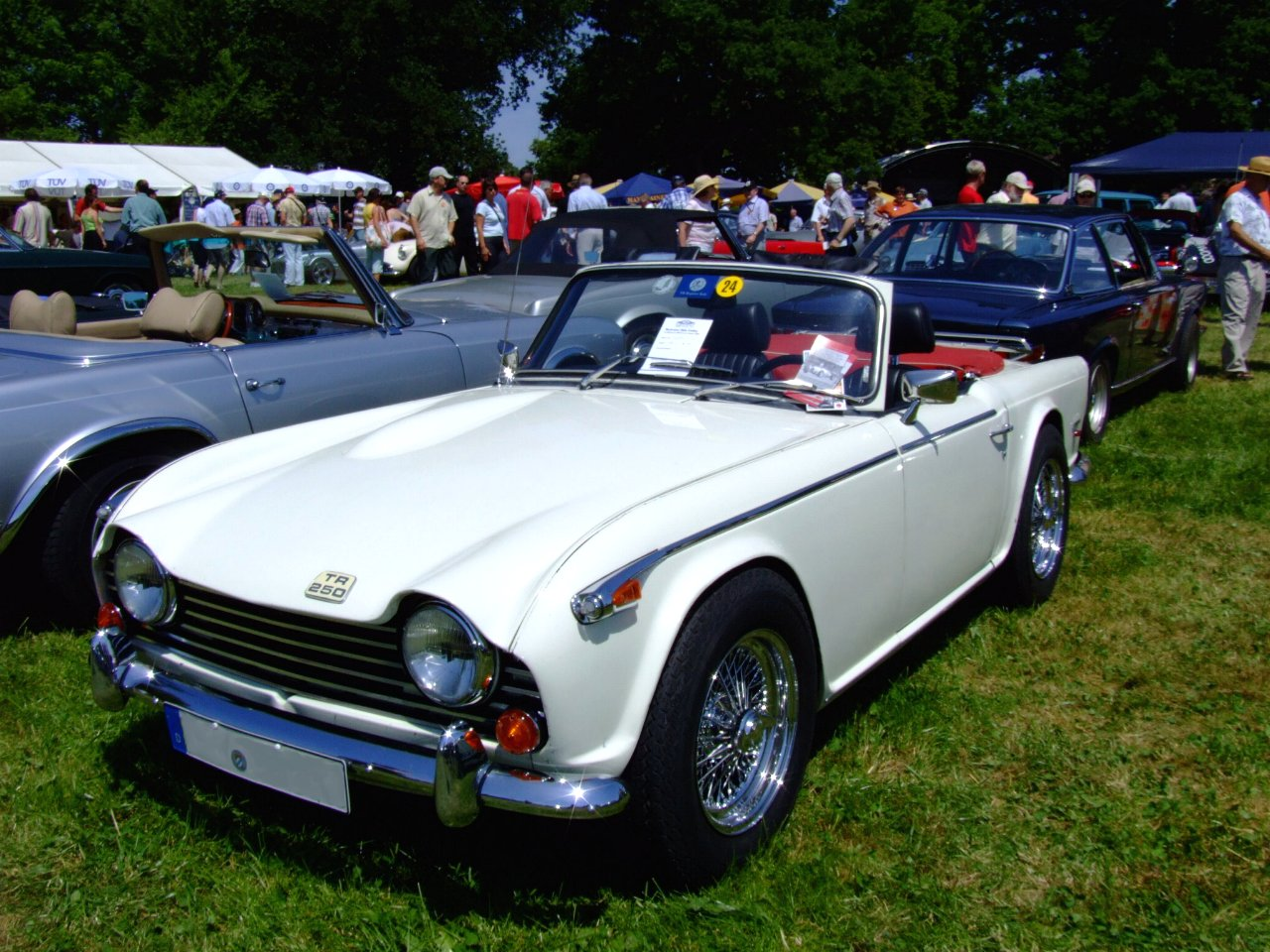
Triumph TR250, US market version of the TR5

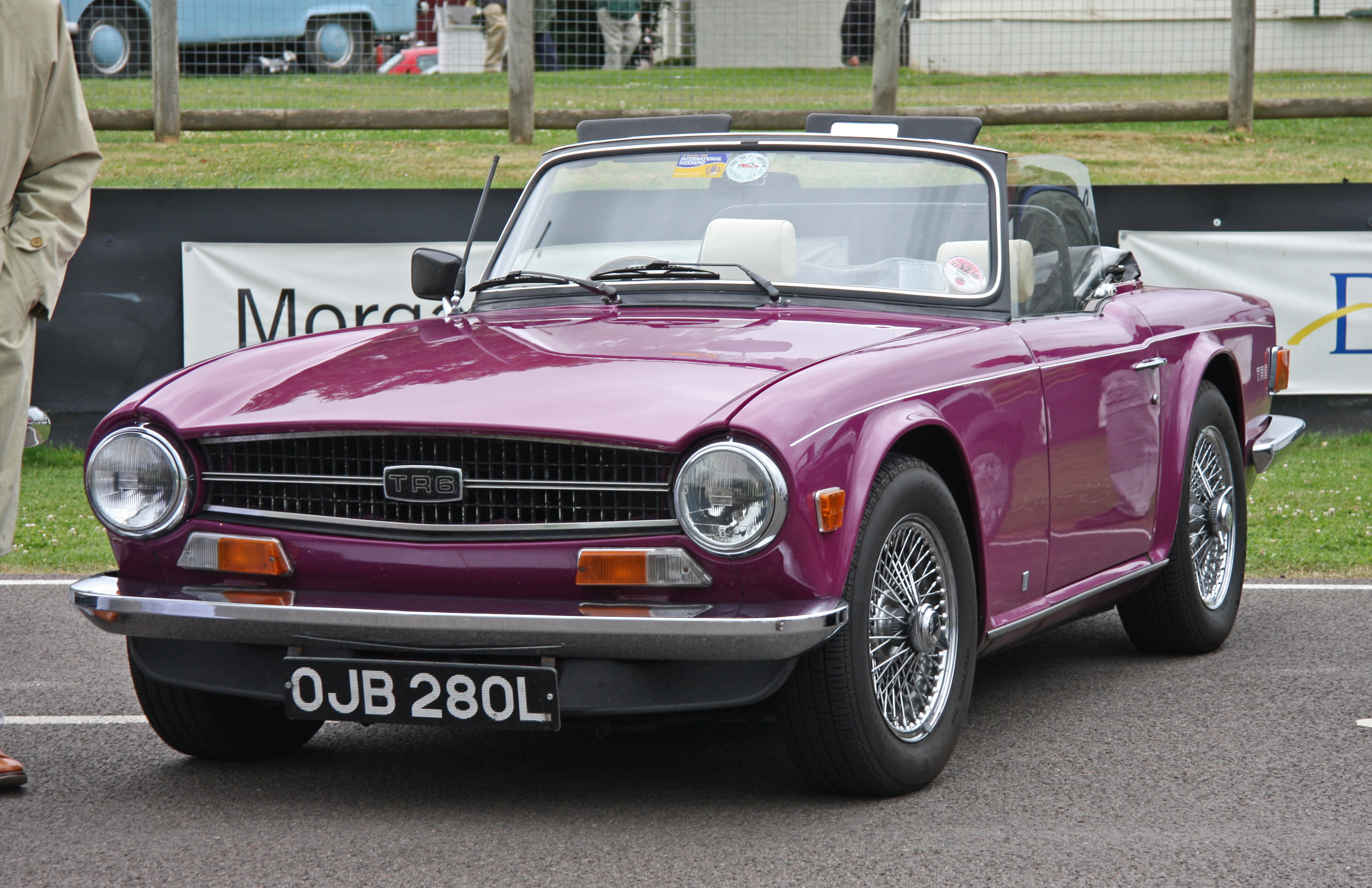
Triumph TR6

=== TR7 and TR8 ===
The Triumph TR7 was introduced in 1974. While all previous TRs were evolutionary designs developed from the TR2, the TR7 was an all-new design owing nothing but its model designation to the earlier TRs. While the TR7's unit body and wedge shape were advertised by Leyland as major improvements, these were offset by the TR7's return to a four-cylinder engine and a live rear axle.

The TR7 was initially available as a coupé, with a convertible version being developed after the launch of the coupé. A premium-grade version using the Rover V8 engine was developed as part of the same project. The TR7 convertible was introduced in 1979. Also introduced in 1979 was the Triumph TR8, a premium V8 version of the TR7.

The TR7 and TR8 were discontinued in 1981.

Triumph TR7 and TR8
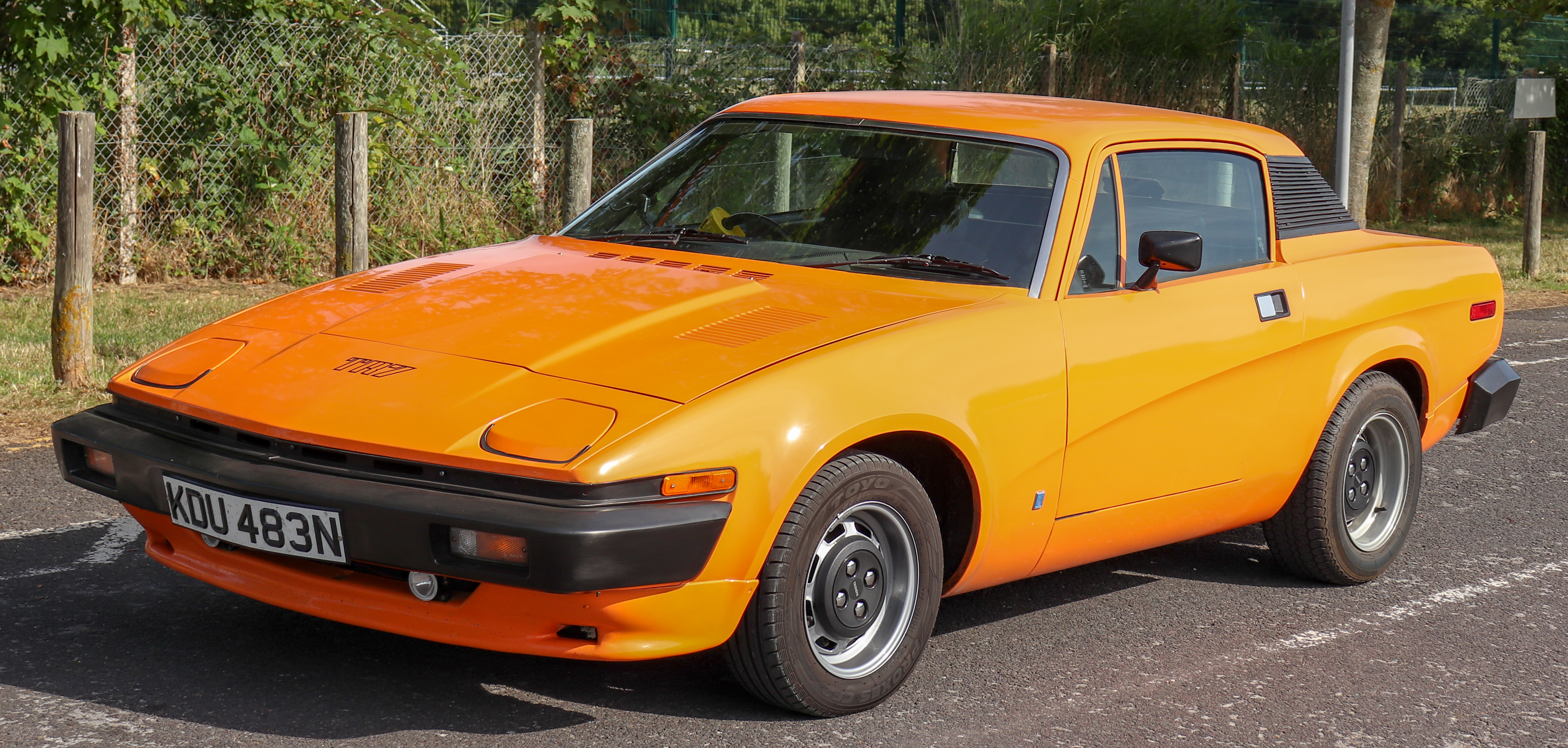
Triumph TR7 hardtop

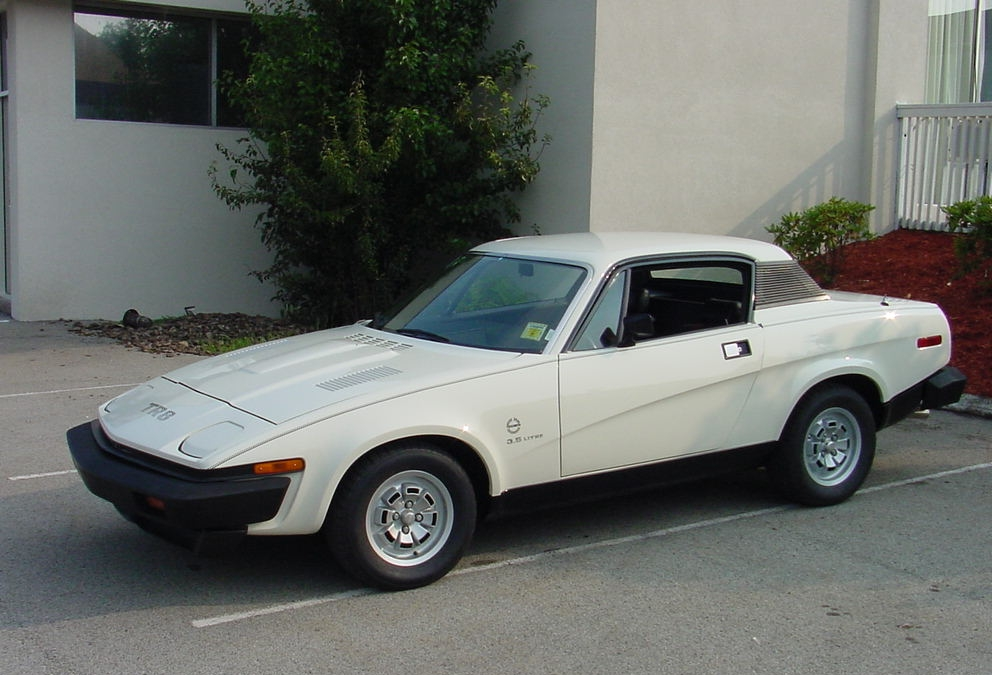
Triumph TR8 hardtop
