= Triumph TR4A =

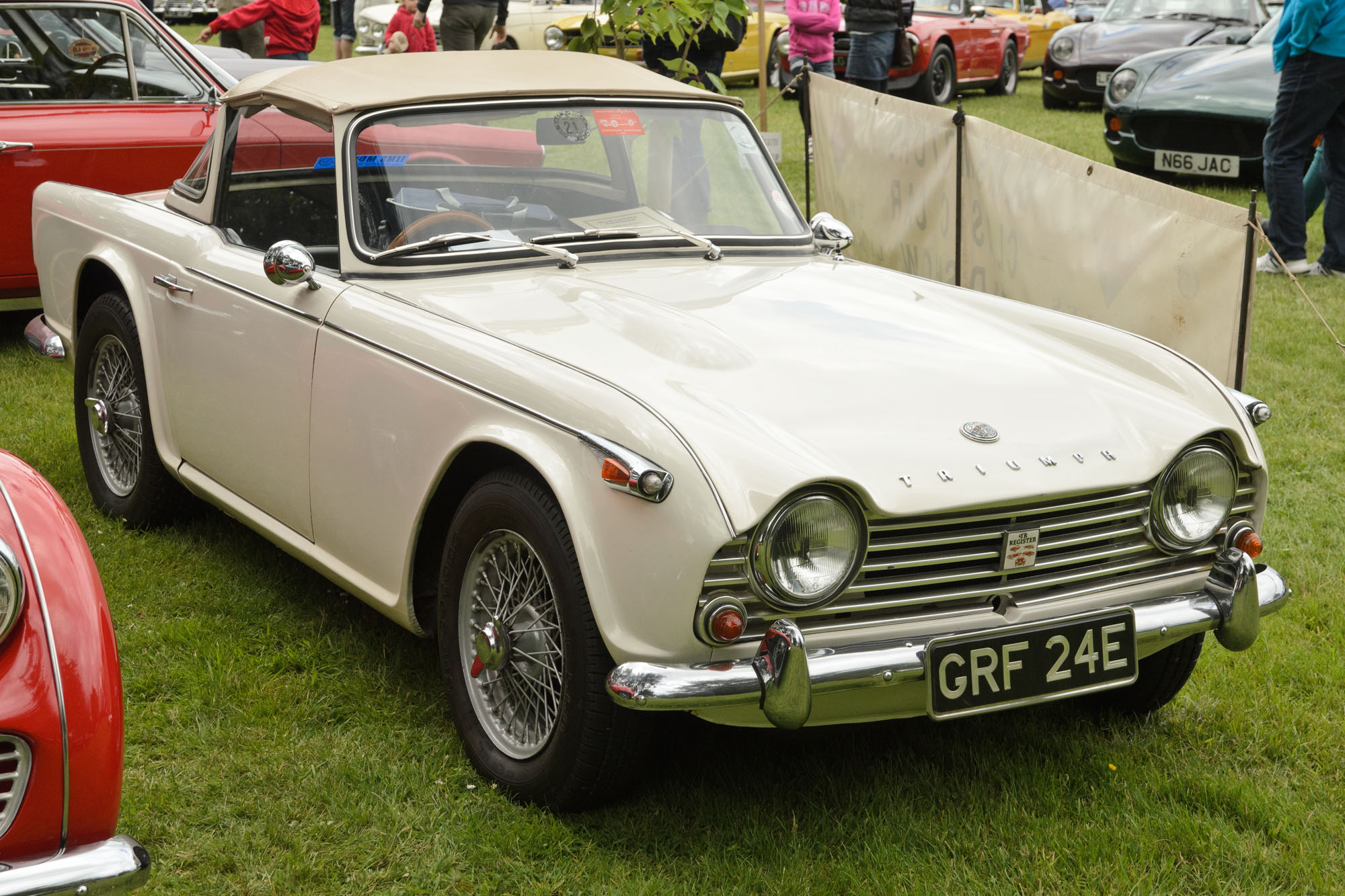

Overview
- Manufacturer: Triumph Motor Company
- Production: 1965–1967
- Assembly: United Kingdom: Coventry
- Designer: Giovanni Michelotti

Body and chassis
- Class: Sports car
- Body style: 2-door open two-seater
- Layout: Front engine, rear wheel drive

Powertrain
- Engine: 2,138 cc (130.5 cu in) I4
- Transmission: 4-speed manual

Dimensions
- Wheelbase: 2,235 mm (88.0 in)
- Length: 3,962 mm (156.0 in)
- Width: 1,473 mm (58.0 in)
- Height: 1,270 mm (50.0 in)
- Kerb weight: 1,016 kg (2,240 lb)

Chronology
- Predecessor: Triumph TR4
- Successor: Triumph TR5/TR250

The Triumph TR4A is a sports car built by the Triumph Motor Company at its Coventry factory in the United Kingdom from 1965 to 1967. It is an evolution of the Giovanni Michelotti styled TR4, with the TR4's Hotchkiss drive replaced by an independent rear suspension, indicated by an "IRS" badge attached to the car's rear.

== Changes from the TR4 ==
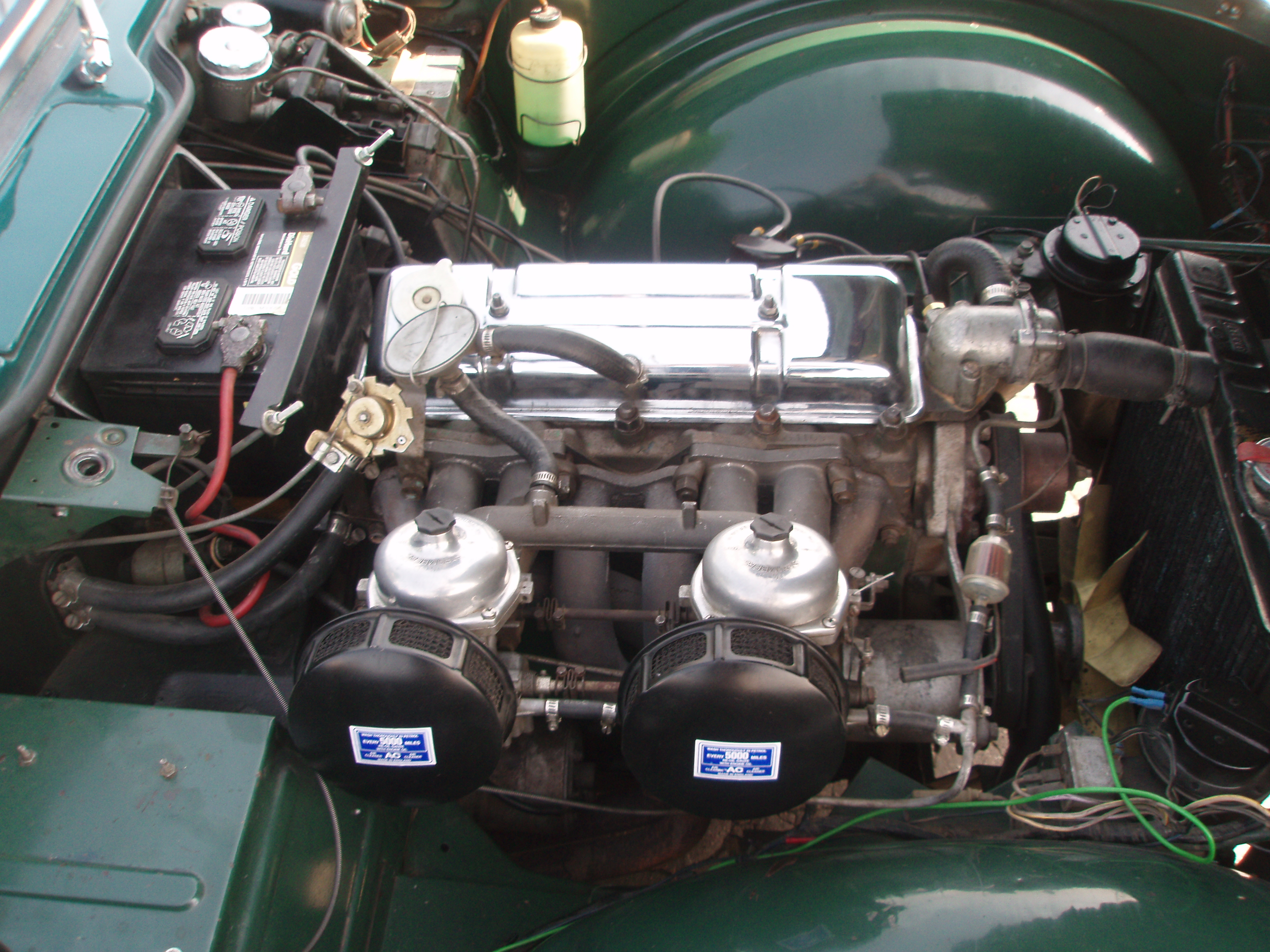
TR4A Engine

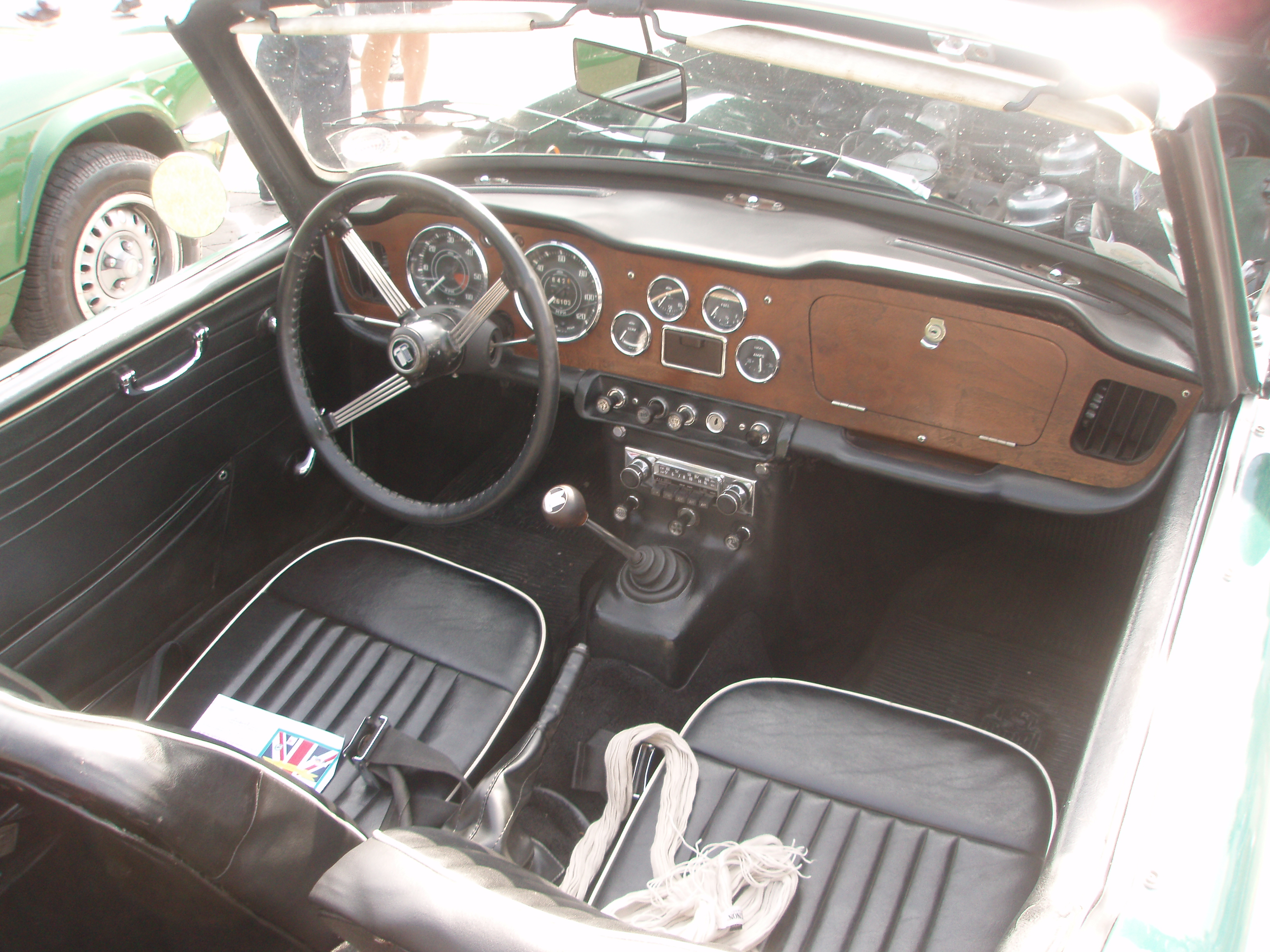
TR4A Interior

The TR4A's rear suspension is a semi-trailing arm system with coil springs and lever-arm shocks. It more closely resembles that of the Triumph 2000 than the swing axle systems used in the Herald or Spitfire. The chassis was redesigned to accommodate the new suspension, with extensive changes to the side members and cross-bracing. After the redesign, reviewers noted the car's better ride comfort, although some felt that handling had not improved.

The chassis revisions resulted in a car roughly 22 mm (0.87 in) wider than the TR4, although length and height were unaffected. The wheelbase is 3 mm (0.12 in) shorter. The front track is unchanged, while the rear track grew by 13 mm (0.51 in) with the IRS. The car is heavier by 50 kg (110 lb).

Although consideration was given to both an enlarged 2.5 litre four-cylinder or a six-cylinder engine, the TR4A used the same long-stroke, high-torque Standard four-cylinder wet-sleeve engine as the TR4. While the bore, stroke, and displacement remained the same, changes to the cylinder head and manifolds raised net power to 104 bhp (78 kW), an increase of 4%, and torque to 132 lb⋅ft (179 N⋅m), an increase of 10%.

Apart from the increase in width and the IRS badge on the rear of the car, other changes include a revised grille and new bonnet badge. There is also a new piece of chrome trim on the side, starting near the rear edge of the door and ending at the front of the car with integrated signal/marker lights, which were moved from their earlier position in the corners of the grille. New smaller front bumpers and a convertible top patterned after the one from the Herald complete the exterior differences. On the interior the fly-off handbrake lever is moved to the transmission tunnel between two revised seats, the gearshift lever is shortened, and fascias in all cars are covered with walnut, which had been optional in the TR4.

In 1965 the TR4A IRS sold in the UK for approximately £968. Wire wheels added £36, overdrive £51, heater £13 and seat belts £4 each;.

== Surrey Top ==
The TR4A continued to offer the "Surrey Top" hard top system as an option. This weather protection system comprises a rigid rear back light, a removable rigid roof panel and a soft fabric panel that was the actual surrey-top. The back light is attached to the rear of the passenger area semi-permanently. Either the roof panel or the soft surrey top bridge the gap between the top of the windshield surround and the top of the back light. This aesthetically foreshadowed the silhouette of Targa top cars.

== Non-IRS ==
In response to requests from United States distributors Bud Forman and Les Genser, Triumph developed a version of the TR4A fitted with a TR4-style rear live axle and made IRS an extra-cost option for the US market. To accommodate the re-introduction of leaf springs, spring brackets were added to the revised chassis. Live axle cars received a commissioning number (Triumph did not use serial numbers) that starts with "CT" — the same prefix used for TR4s. IRS equipped cars' commissioning numbers begin with "CTC". The price in the United States was just under $2500.

== Motorsports ==
Even though the SCCA declined to homologate the TR4A in 1965, Kas Kastner, Triumph's US Competition Manager, and his modified "Super Stock" TR4A won the D-modified National Championship in 1965 at Daytona with driver Charlie Gates.

Bob Tullius' Group 44 and others successfully campaigned these cars during the 1965 to 1973 seasons, accumulating a respectable collection of finishes.

The high point of the TR4A's racing history is the team win by three TR4A IRS models at the Sebring 12-hour race of 1966, finishing 1st, 2nd and 3rd in their class.

== Successor ==
In 1968 the TR4A was replaced by a new model powered by Triumph's 2.5-litre straight-6. In the UK and most other markets this car was equipped with Lucas fuel injection and called the TR5. In the United States, price pressure and tighter emissions standards resulted in a less powerful but otherwise identical car fitted with twin Zenith-Stromberg carburetters, called the TR250.

== Survivors ==
In Q1 2011 there were approximately 789 licensed and 153 SORN TR4As registered with the DVLA.

As of Q1 2023, this had risen to 1,028 licensed and 209 SORN.

== Technical data ==
Triumph TR4A	Detail:
Engine:	Standard wet liner inline-four engine
Bore × Stroke:	86 mm × 92 mm (3.386 in × 3.622 in)
Displacement:	2,138 cc (130.5 cu in)
Maximum power:	104 bhp (77.6 kW) at 4,700 rpm
Maximum torque:	132.5 ft⋅lb (179.6 N⋅m) at 3,000 rpm
Compression ratio:	9.0:1 (optional 7.0:1)
Valvetrain:	Single cam-in-block, pushrods, rocker arms, 2 overhead valves per cylinder
Induction:	Two Stromberg 175CD carburetters or Two SU HS6 carburetters
Cooling:	Water-cooled
Transmission:	4-speed manual with reverse (optional overdrive)
Steering:	Alford & Alder rack and pinion
Turns lock-to-lock:	2.5
Turning circle:	33.0 ft (10.1 m)
Brakes f/r:	Girling discs/drums
Suspension front:	Upper and lower wishbones, coil springs, telescopic dampers
Suspension rear:	Semi-trailing arms, coil springs, piston-type dampers
Body/Chassis:	Steel body on steel ladder chassis
Track f/r:	49 / 48.5 in (1,245 / 1,232 mm) (disc wheels); 49.75 / 49.25 in (1,264 / 1,251 mm) (wire wheels)
Wheelbase:	88.0 in (2,235 mm)
Tyres f/r:	5.5/5.90x15
Length; Width; Height:	156.0 in (3,962 mm); 58.0 in (1,473 mm); 50.0 in (1,270 mm)
Weight:	2,240 lb (1,016 kg)
Capacities: Fuel: Cooling: Sump: Transmission:	14 US gal (53.0 L; 11.7 imp gal); 16.8 US pt (7.9 L; 14.0 imp pt); 13.2 US pt (6.2 L; 11.0 imp pt); 1.8 US pt (0.9 L; 1.5 imp pt) (non-overdrive); 4.2 US pt (2.0 L; 3.5 imp pt) (overdrive)
Acceleration in top: 30 to 50 mph (48 to 80 km/h): 40 to 60 mph (64 to 97 km/h): 60 to 80 mph (97 to 129 km/h):	8 seconds 8 seconds 11 seconds
Maximum speed:	109 mph (175 km/h)
