= Triumph TR5 =

1960s Triumph automobile

Triumph TR5 Triumph TR250
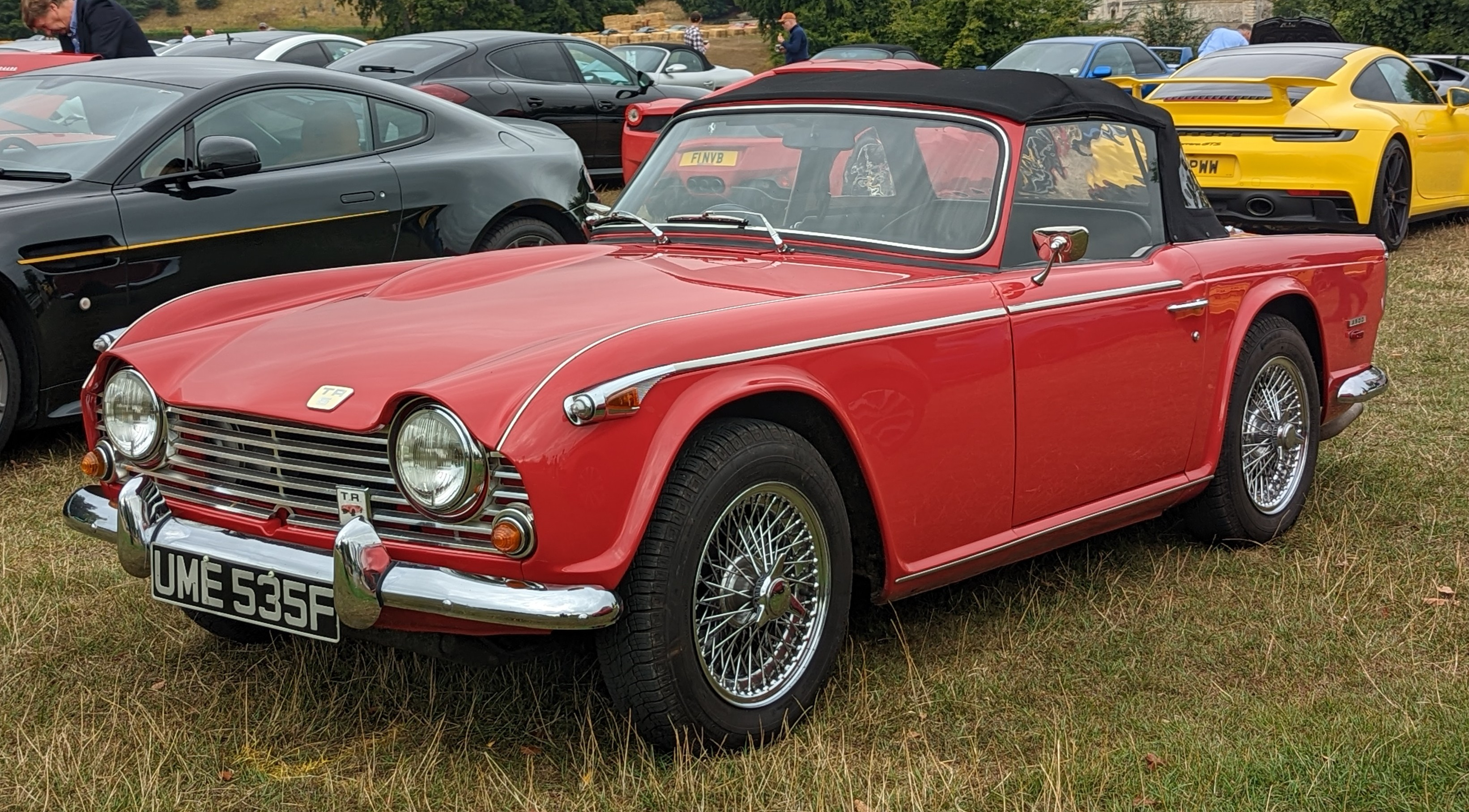

Overview
- Manufacturer: Triumph Motor Company
- Production: August 1967 – September 1968
- Assembly: United Kingdom: Coventry
- Designer: Giovanni Michelotti

Body and chassis
- Class: Sports car
- Body style: Open two-seater
- Layout: Front-engine, rear-wheel-drive

Powertrain
- Engine: 2.5-litre straight-6
- Transmission: 4-speed manual, optional overdrive

Dimensions
- Wheelbase: 2,240 mm (88.2 in)
- Length: 3,902 mm (153.6 in)
- Width: 1,470 mm (57.9 in)
- Height: 1,170 mm (46.1 in)
- Kerb weight: 1,030 kg (2,271 lb)

Chronology
- Predecessor: Triumph TR4A
- Successor: Triumph TR6

The Triumph TR5 is a sports car built by the Triumph Motor Company in Coventry, England. The Triumph TR250 is a version of the car built for the North American market. Production ran for 14 months, from August 1967 to September 1968.

== History ==
With the release of the TR4 in 1961, Triumph left behind the sidescreen era cars for a model with more contemporary full-width styling, and the arrival of the TR4A in 1965 brought a revised chassis and independent rear suspension. These changes were accompanied by steady increases in weight, while horsepower only rose nominally. To address this creeping performance deficit, and anticipating that the TR4's Standard wet liner inline-four engine could not be made to meet more stringent American emission regulations coming into effect in 1968, Triumph began development of a successor to the TR4.

Triumph began testing a six-cylinder TR as early as 1962. Even before the TR4A was available in showrooms, Triumph started the "Wasp" programme to develop its successor. At least seven Wasp cars were built for testing and development. Chassis X747 was completed in February 1965; X748 was ready in February 1966; X753, X754, and X755 were registered for road use in 1967; prototypes X760 and X761 were also built in 1967.

Triumph selected a British-made fuel injection system to handle the car's air/fuel mixture, but was unable to make the system compliant with new American emission standards. In addition, American Triumph dealers objected to the injected engine's price premium. These issues led Triumph to develop two versions of the car to be sold under different names in different markets—the carburetted TR250 for the North American market, and the fuel-injected TR5 for the rest of the world.

American dealers had previously balked at the cost of the TR4A's independent rear suspension (IRS), and convinced Triumph to sell a less expensive version of the car with a live rear axle on semi-elliptic springs in the US. As no objections were raised to the IRS in the TR5, no beam axle version of it was developed.

Production of the TR4A ended in July 1964, with production of the TR250 beginning immediately afterwards, and TR5 production starting a short time later.

== Features ==
The TR5's open two-seater body is nearly indistinguishable from the Michelotti-designed TR4 that preceded it. Externally, there are a new grille, side trim, rear marker lights, and badges. Standard wheels are steel with Rostyle-inspired covers, with wire wheels optional. On the interior, padded spokes on the steering wheel and updated knobs and switches signal compliance with new American safety standards. The dash was still of wood, but now with a matte finish.

The previous cars' optional hard top configuration continued to be offered. This weather protection system comprised a fixed, rigid rear section that included a glass back light, and a removable section over the driver and passenger's heads. The removable section came in two types: a rigid panel made of steel or fibreglass, and a flexible one made of fabric, called a "surrey top".

The chassis is similar to the TR4A's, although some front chassis members were relocated to allow the radiator to be moved forward to clear the longer engine. The front suspension is the same double wishbone suspension used in the TR4A.

The rear suspension is a refinement of the system in the TR4A, with stiffer springs and semi-trailing arms redesigned to clear the wider 4.5 in (114 mm) wide wheels on the new car.

The TR5's gearbox and overdrive are the same as those in the TR4A. While TR250s kept the TR4's final drive ratio, the final drive ratio in TR5s was higher (numerically lower).

The front disc brakes are increased in size to 10.875 inches. A brake assist servo, which had been an optional extra until the TR4A, was made standard equipment.

The most significant change from the previous car is the engine. The TR5 is powered by a 2.5-litre version of the Triumph straight-6 engine, rather than the 2.1-litre, 105 bhp (78 kW) SAE Standard wet liner inline-four in the TR4.

The engine in the TR5 and TR250 is based on the 2.0-litre six that debuted in the Standard Vanguard Six in 1960 and was used in various Triumph models. That engine was in turn a six-cylinder derivative of the four-cylinder Standard SC engine that first appeared in the Standard Eight and continued to power the Triumph Spitfire.

At 74.7 mm (2.94 in), the cylinder bore diameters were already at their maximum size in the 2.0-litre block. To accommodate a new cranskaft with a 19 mm (0.75 in) increase in the engine's stroke, Triumph redesigned the cylinder block. The cylinder head was also redesigned, resulting in a more rigid part with better breathing.

== TR5 ==
The base price of a TR5 in the UK in 1968 was £1,260 including taxes. Standard equipment included front disc brakes, independent rear suspension, rack and pinion steering and a four speed gearbox. Optional extras included wire wheels (£38), overdrive (£60), and a tonneau cover (£13).

=== TR5-specific features ===
The TR5's engine was fitted with Lucas Mark II mechanical fuel-injection. Triumph claimed that the TR5 was the "First British production sports car with petrol injection".

The camshaft was also a high-performance type with large overlaps and high valve lift. The compression ratio was 9.5:1.

Due to the higher power output, the car's differential case and half-shafts were strengthened. The higher output also allowed the use of a 3.45:1 final drive ratio.

=== Colour options ===
- Available colours:

Paint	Trim
New White	Black / Matador Red
Triumph Racing Green	Black, Light Tan
Signal Red	Black
Jasmine Yellow	Black / Light Tan
Royal Blue	Black / Shadow Blue
Wedgewood Blue	Black / Shadow Blue
Valencia Blue	Black / Light Tan

=== Performance ===
According to Triumph, the fuel-injected engine could propel the TR5 from 0–50 mph (80 km/h) in 6.5 seconds, reaching a top speed of 125 mph (201 km/h). Road tests at the time reported slightly different performance figures:

	Sports Car World October 1968	Cars & Car Conversions September 1968	Motor 4 May 1968
0–50 mph (0–80 km/h)	6.2 s	6.4 s	6.3 s
Top Speed	118 mph (190 km/h)	112 mph (180 km/h)	117 mph (188 km/h)

=== Production ===
With 2,947 units produced, the TR5 was built in smaller numbers than either the TR250 or the later TR6. The first car was assembled on 29 August 1967 and the last on 19 September 1968. Of these, 1,161 were destined for the UK market, the remainder were left hand drive and were exported to France, Belgium and Germany amongst other countries. In the first quarter of 2011 there were approximately 410 licensed and 74 SORN TR5s registered with the DVLA.

== TR250 ==
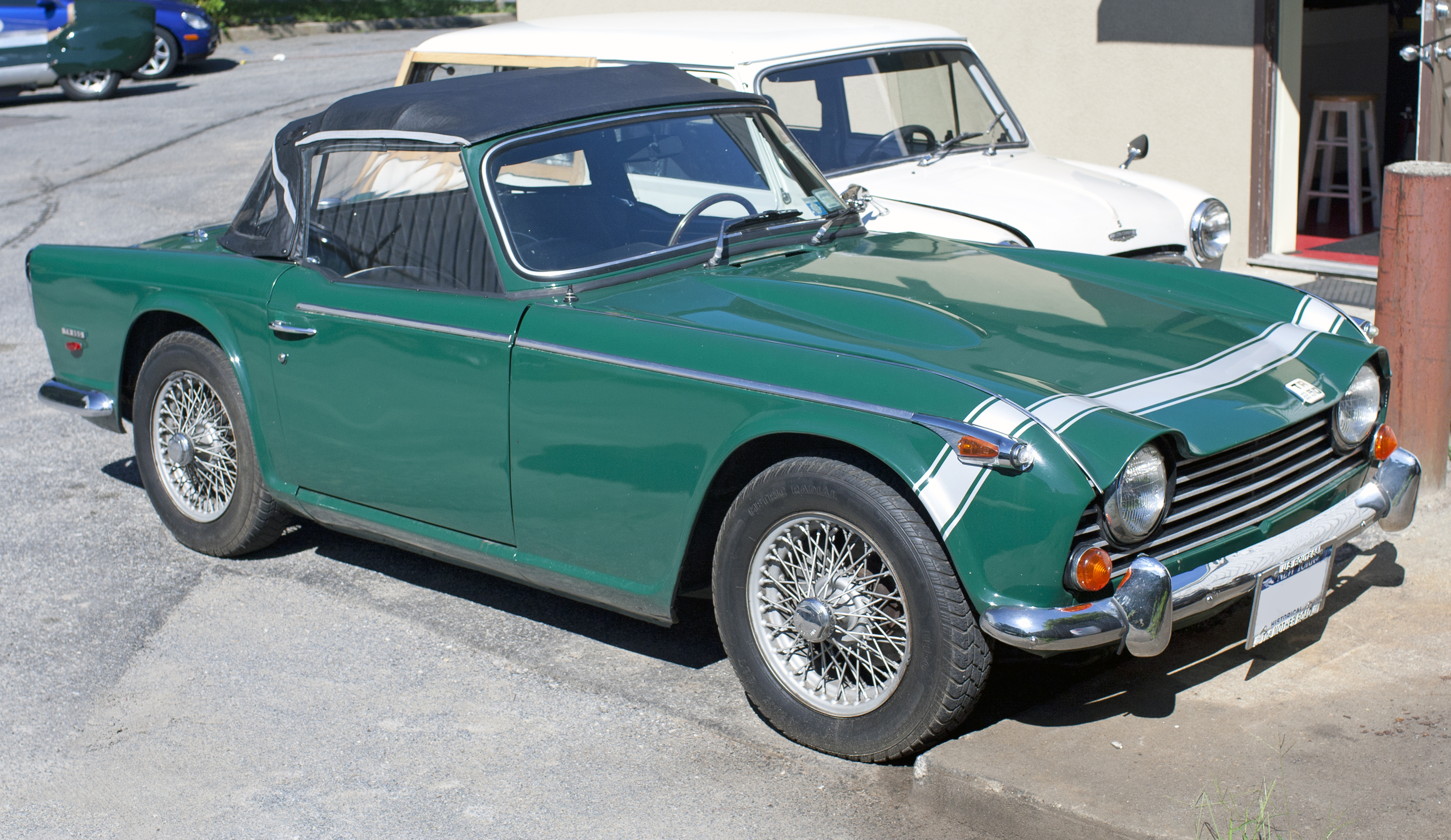
TR250 with wire wheels

The Triumph TR250 was built during the same period for the North American market.

In 1968, it sold in the US for approximately US$3,395, with wire wheels an $118 option, overdrive $175, and air conditioning $395.

=== TR250-specific features ===
The TR250 is visually distinguished from the TR5 by its model-specific badging, larger front indicator lamps, and a speed-stripe across the front of the nose of the car.

Price pressures and tighter US emission regulations resulted in the TR250 receiving twin Zenith-Stromberg carburettors instead of fuel injection. This change, along with a lower compression ratio and a milder camshaft, combine to reduce power output to 111 bhp (83 kW), 39 bhp (29 kW) less than the TR5. Due to the lower engine output, the car's differential housing and 3.70:1 final drive ratio are the same as the TR4A's.

=== Performance ===
The TR250's 0–60 mph (0–97 km/h) acceleration time is 10.6 seconds.

=== Production ===
A total of 8,484 TR250s were built, most destined for the US and Canada. More than 1300 TR250s are still viable; many of those are outside the United States, primarily in Europe.

== Technical information ==
Technical detail comparison table for Triumph TR5 and TR250
Detail	TR5	TR250
Engine	Triumph inline-six engine	
Bore × Stroke	74.7 mm × 95 mm (2.94 in × 3.74 in)	
Displacement	2.5 L (2,498 cc; 152.4 cu in)	
Compression	9.5:1	8.5:1
Peak power	142 bhp (106 kW) at 5500 rpm	111 bhp (83 kW) at 4500 rpm
Peak torque	164 lb⋅ft (222 N⋅m) at 3000 rpm	152 lb⋅ft (206 N⋅m) at 3000 rpm
Valvetrain	Single cam-in-block, pushrods and rocker arms, 2 overhead valves per cylinder	
Induction	Lucas Mark II mechanical fuel injection	2 side-draught Zenith-Stromberg 175CD carburettors
Cooling	Water cooling	
Gearbox	4-speed manual. Optional overdrive	
Gear ratios	First: 3.12:1; Second: 2.01:1; Third: 1.32:1; Fourth: 1.00:1; Overdrive: 0.818:1	
Final drive ratio	3.45:1	3.70:1
Front suspension	Upper and lower wishbones, coil springs, telescopic dampers	
Rear suspension	Semi-trailing arms, coil springs, lever-arm dampers	
Body and chassis	Steel body on separate steel ladder chassis with cruciform bracing	
Steering	Rack and pinion	
Turning circle	33 ft (10.1 m)	
Brakes f/r	Disc / drums	
Wheelbase	88 in (2,235 mm)	
Track front/rear	49.75 / 49.0 in (1,264 / 1,245 mm) (Wire wheels add another half inch)	
Tyres front/rear	Michelin XAS 165HR × 15	Goodyear 185SR-15
Length	153.6 in (3,901 mm)	
Width	58 in (1,473 mm)	
Height	50 in (1,270 mm)	
Kerb weight	2,280 lb (1,034 kg)	2,350 lb (1,066 kg)
Top speed	117 mph (188 km/h)	107 mph (172 km/h)
Standing 1/4 mile	16.5 seconds	17.8 seconds
0–60 mph (0–97 km/h)	8.1 seconds	10.6 seconds
0–100 mph (0–161 km/h)	28.7 seconds	39.0 seconds
Fuel consumption	Touring: 24.7 mpg_{‑imp} (11.4 L/100 km; 20.6 mpg_{‑US}); Overall: 19.9 mpg_{‑imp} (14.2 L/100 km; 16.6 mpg_{‑US})	23.5 miles per US gallon (10.0 L/100 km; 28.2 mpg_{‑imp})

== Gallery ==
Triumph TR5

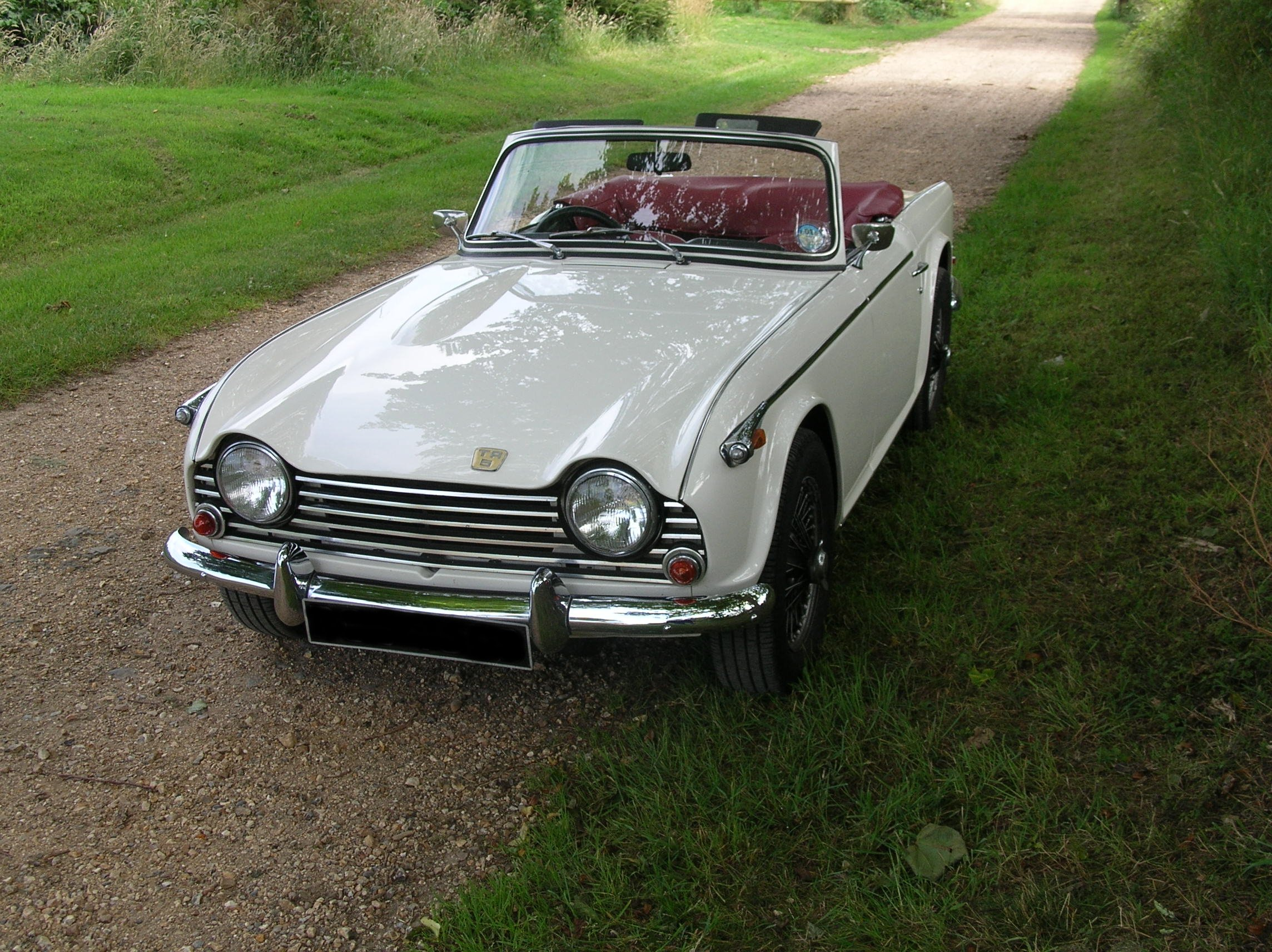
1968 TR5 front quarter view

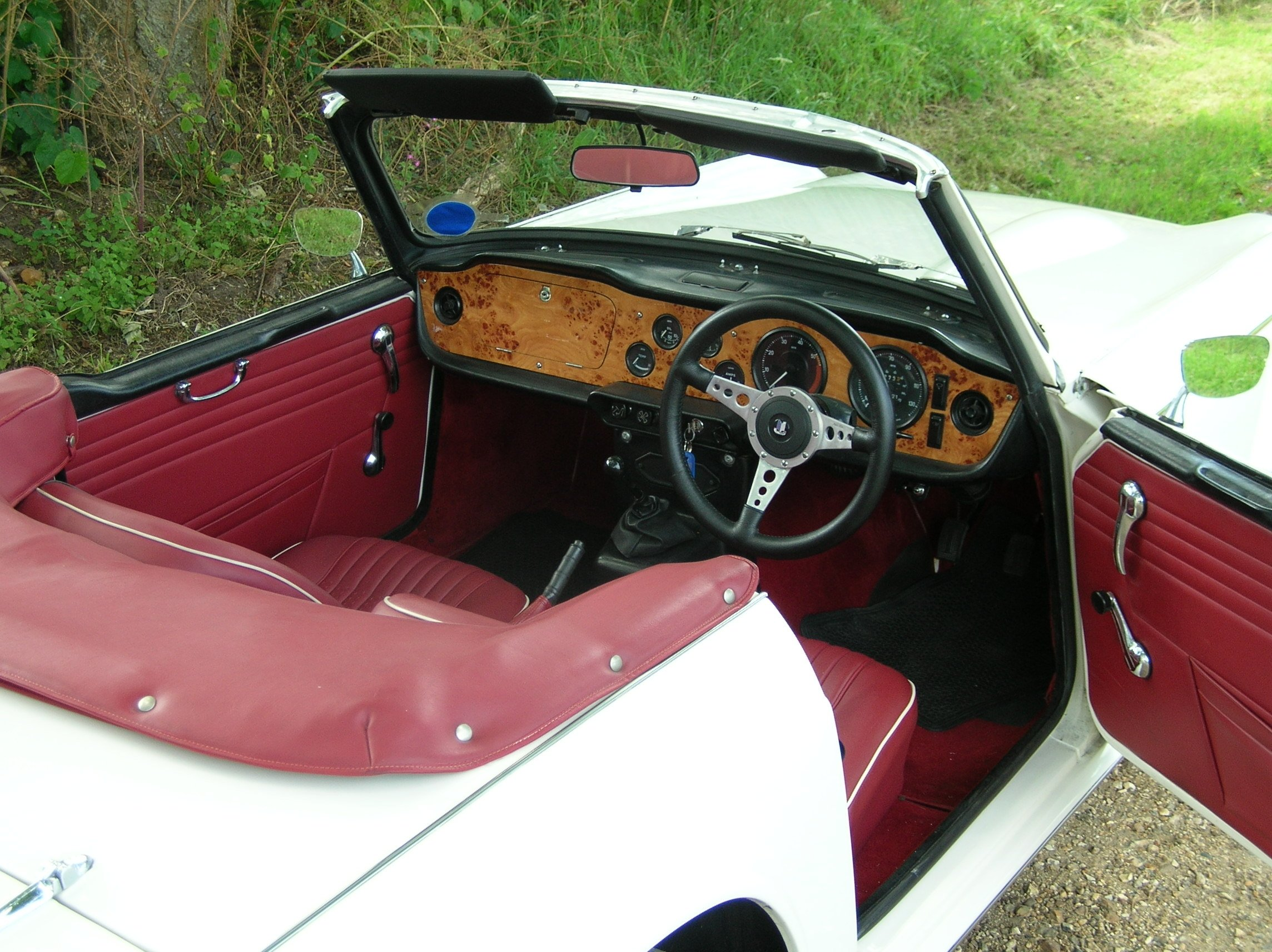
1968 TR5 interior

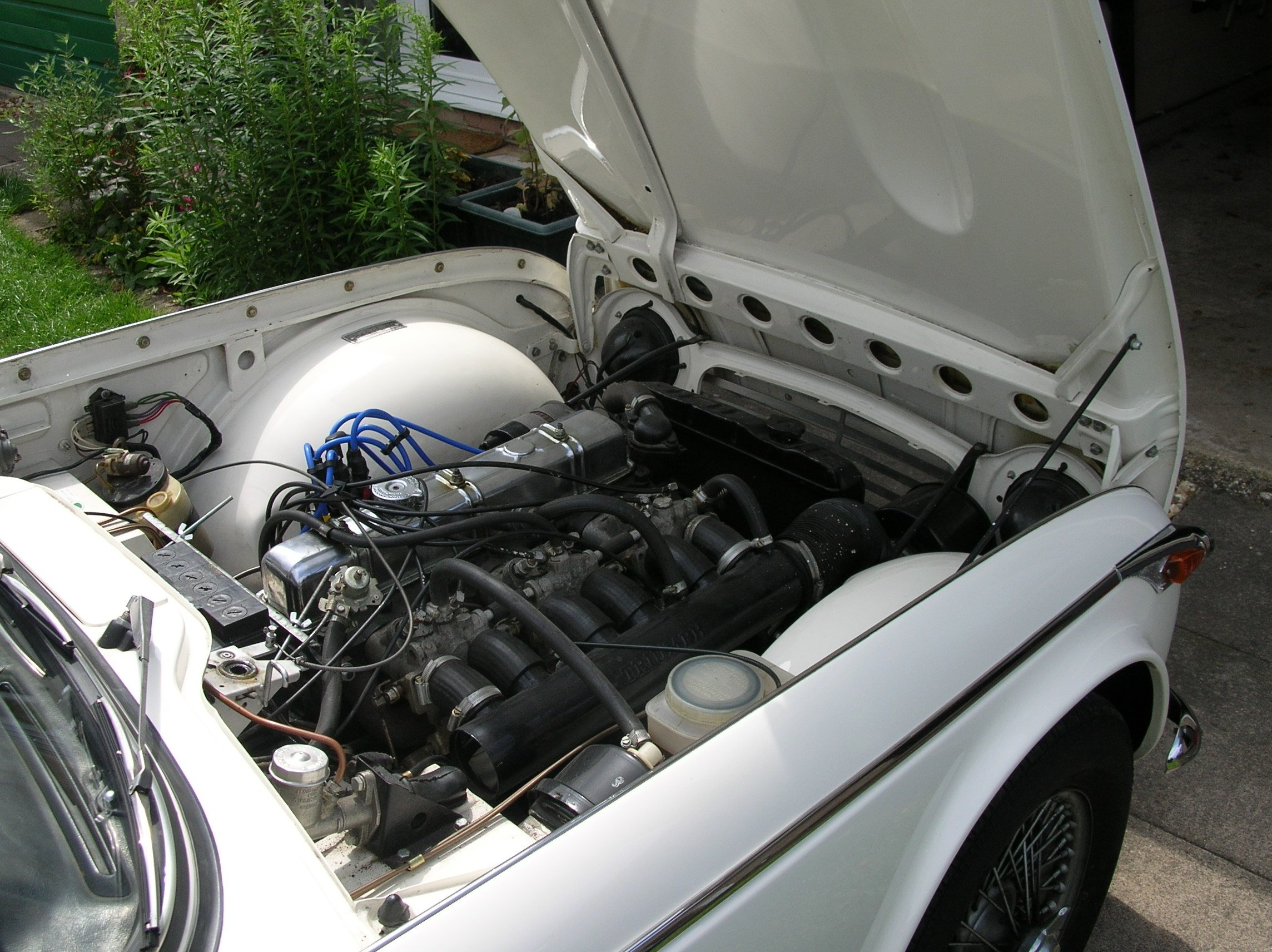
1968 TR5 engine bay

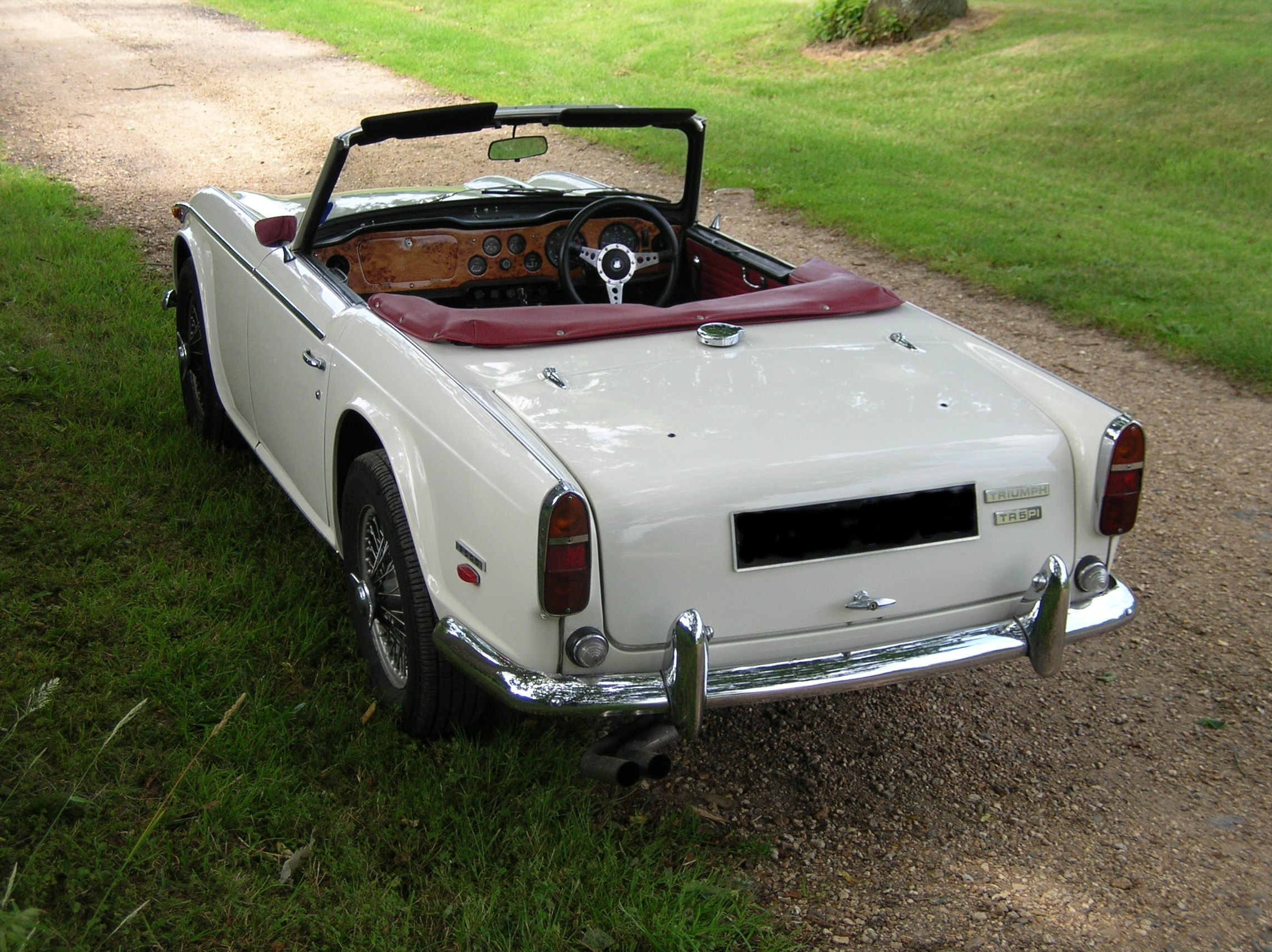
1968 TR5 rear quarter view

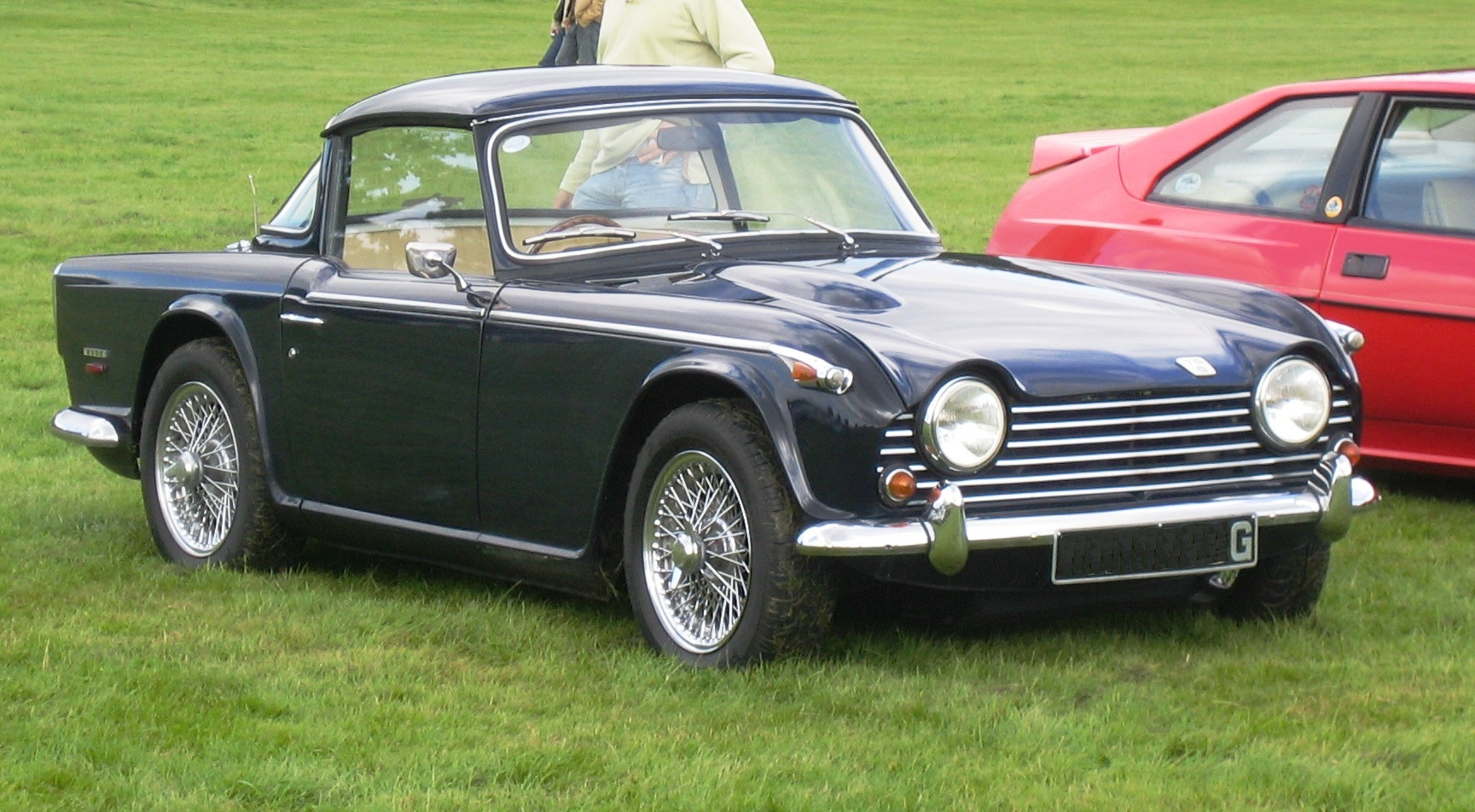
TR5 hardtop with Surrey top in place

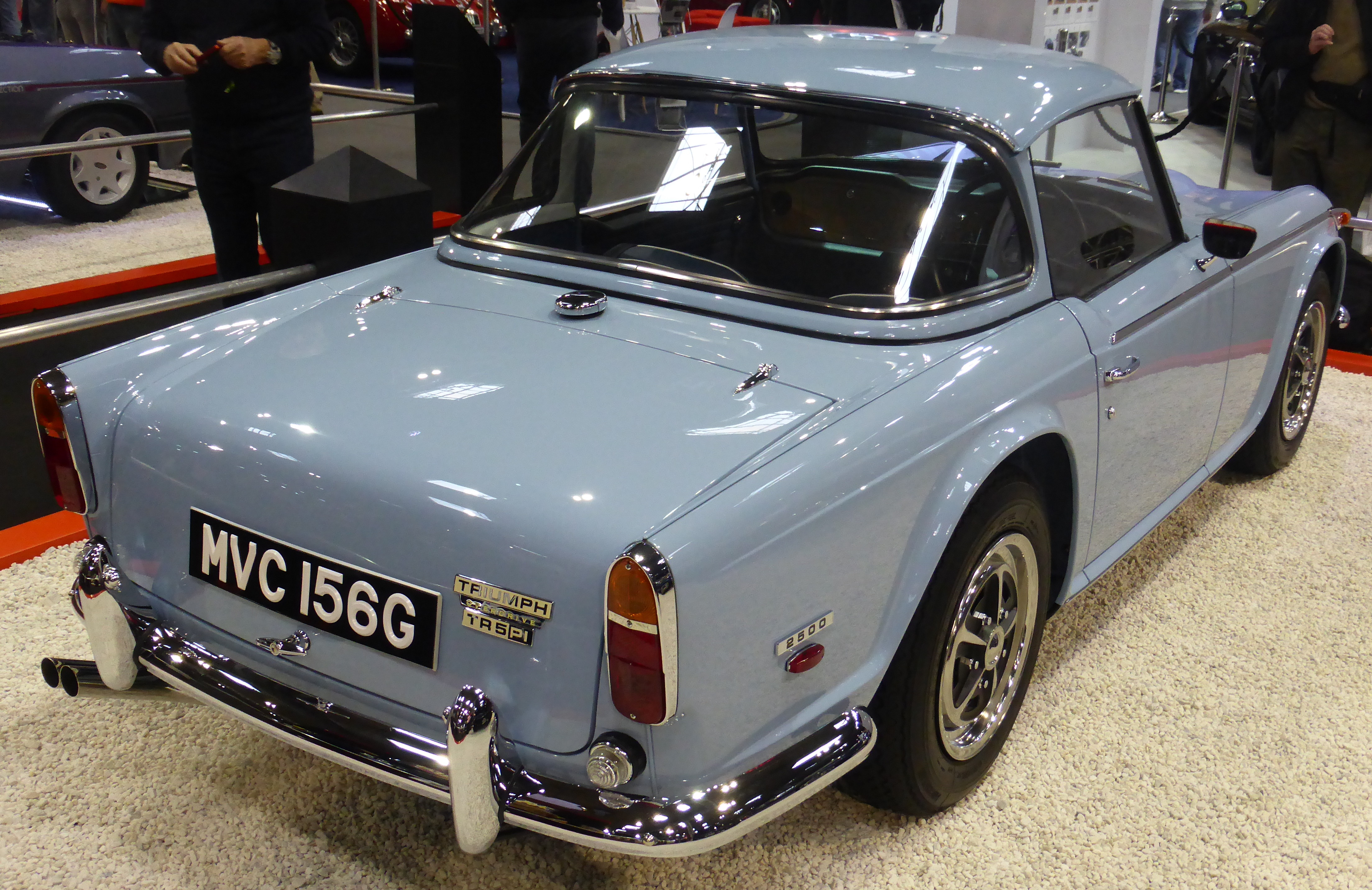
TR5 hardtop with rigid panel in place

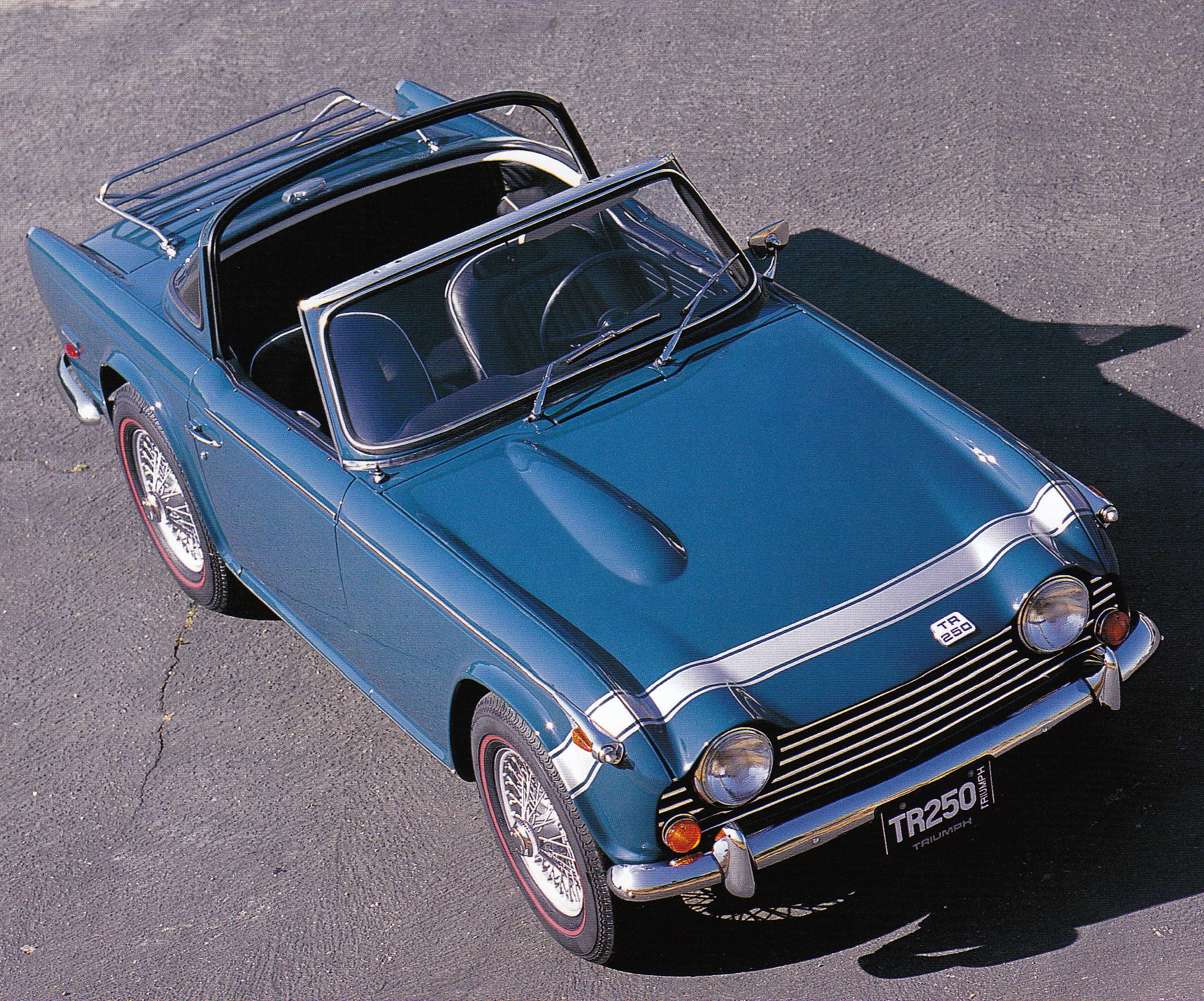
TR250 hardtop with panel removed

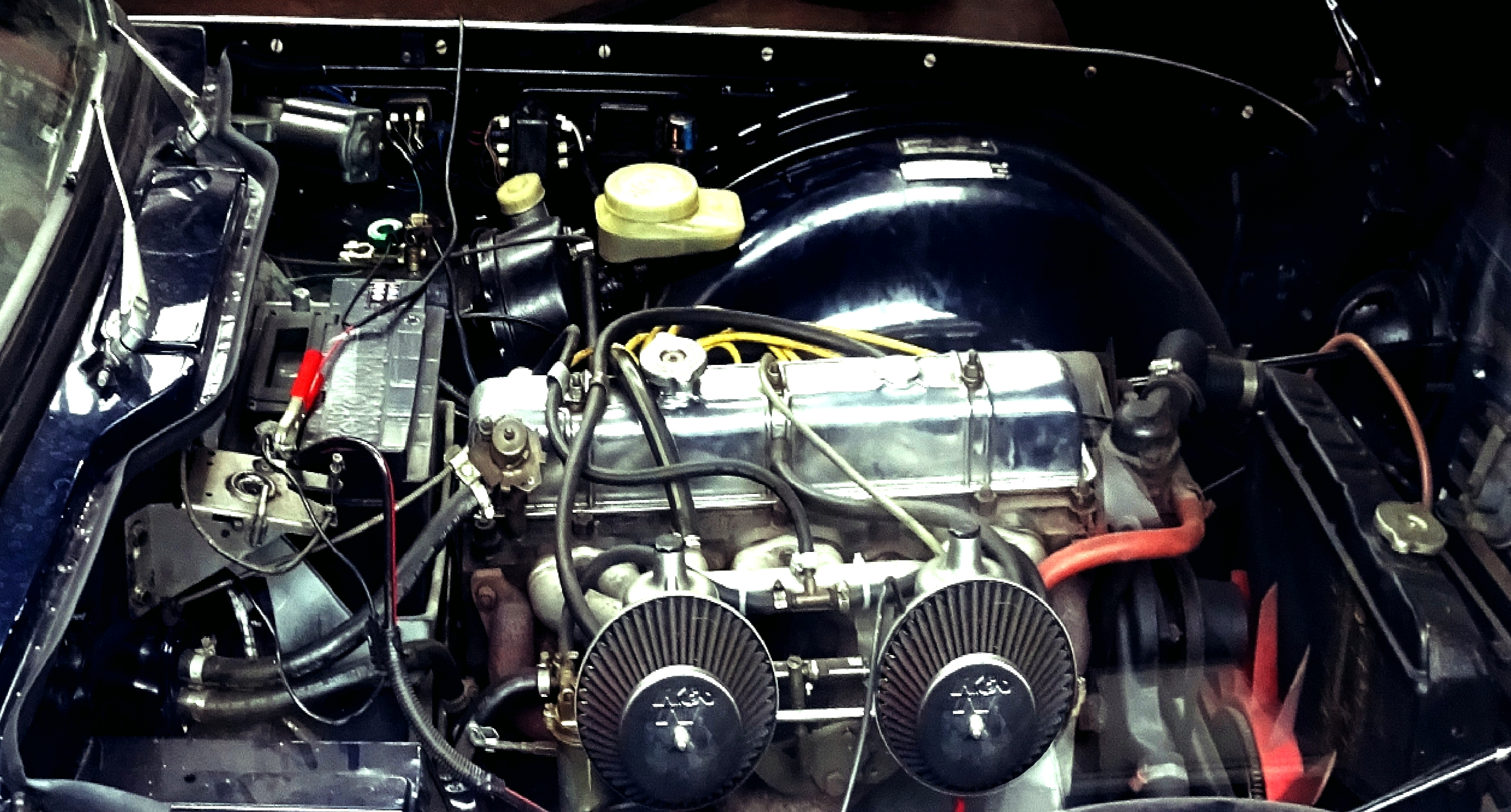
TR250 engine bay

== Triumph TR5 Ginevra ==
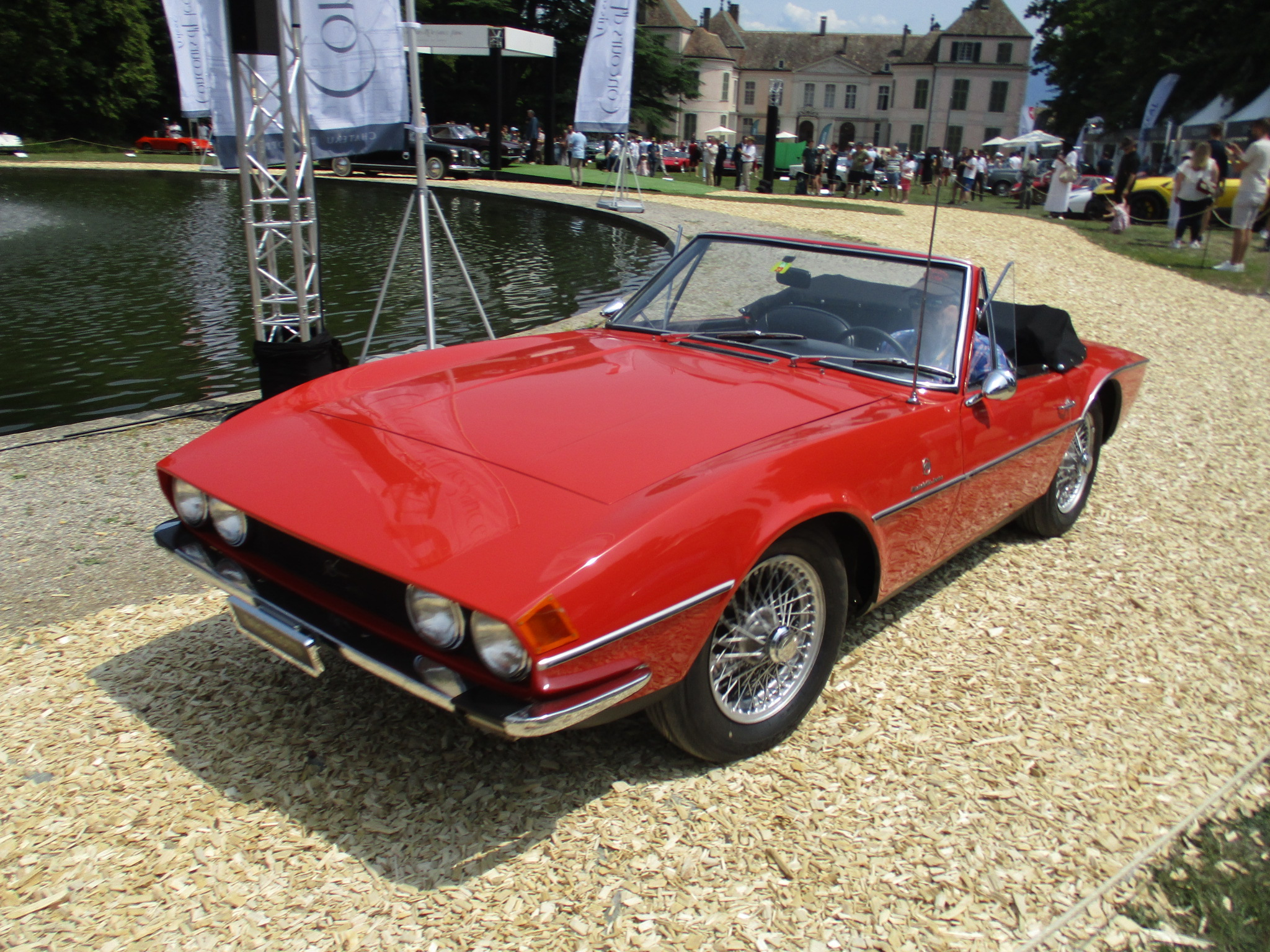
Triumph TR5 Ginevra

The Triumph TR5 Ginevra is a prototype automobile that was the result of an extremely rapid development effort by Michelotti.

At the Geneva International Motor Show scheduled for March 1968, Michelotti anticipated having the brand new Michelotti-designed Triumph Stag on their stand. Shortly before the show date, Standard-Triumph management decided that the car would be displayed on the Triumph stand, leaving a large gap in Michelotti's display.

To produce a new car for the show, Michelotti pressed employees, family and even friends into service, working for fifteen straight days and nights to complete this one-off car, given the prototype designation of X760. The Ginevra is based on a TR5 chassis, but in the place of the production model's 2.5-litre engine is a 2.0-litre version of the Triumph straight six. The Ginevra kept the Lucas fuel injection system of the production TR5. The transmission is a 4-speed manual with a Laycock de Normanville overdrive.

While Michelotti may have presented the car as the successor to the TR5, it was Karmann, not Michelotti, that refreshed the aging TR5 to produce the Triumph TR6. After the Geneva show, Giovanni Michelotti used the Ginevra as his personal vehicle for several years.
