= Bicycle brake =

Braking device for bicycles

Animation of a single pivot side-pull caliper brake for the rear wheel of a steel framed road bike.

A bicycle brake reduces the speed of a bicycle or prevents the wheels from moving. The two main types are: rim brakes and disc brakes. Drum brakes are less common on bicycles.

Most bicycle brake systems consist of three main components: a mechanism for the rider to apply the brakes, such as brake levers or pedals; a mechanism for transmitting that signal, such as Bowden cables, hydraulic hoses, rods, or the bicycle chain; and the brake mechanism itself, a caliper or drum, to press two or more surfaces together in order to convert, via friction, kinetic energy of the bike and rider into thermal energy to be dissipated.

== History ==
Karl Drais included a pivoting brake shoe that could be pressed against the rear iron tyre of his 1817 Laufmaschine. This was continued on the earliest bicycles with pedals, such as the boneshaker, which were fitted with a spoon brake to press onto the rear wheel. The brake was operated by a lever or by a cord connecting to the handlebars. The rider could also slow down by resisting the pedals of the fixed-wheel drive.

The next development of bicycles, the penny-farthings, were similarly braked with a spoon brake or by back pedalling. During its development from 1870 to 1878, there were various designs for brakes, most of them operating on the rear wheel. However, as the rear wheel became smaller and smaller, with more of the rider's weight over the front wheel, braking on the rear wheel became less effective. The front brake, introduced by John Kean in 1873, had been generally adopted by 1880 because of its greater stopping power.

Some penny-farthing riders used only back pedalling and got off and walked down steep hills, but most also used a brake. Having a brake meant that riders could coast down hill by taking their feet off the pedals and placing the legs over the handlebars, although most riders preferred to dismount and walk down steep hills. Putting the legs under the handlebars with the feet off the pedals placed on foot-rests on the forks had resulted in serious accidents caused by the feet getting caught in the spokes.

An alternative to the spoon brake for penny-farthings was the caliper brake patented by Browett and Harrison in 1887. This early version of caliper braking used a rubber block to contact the outside of the penny-farthing's small rear tyre.

The 1870s and 1880s saw the development of the safety bicycle which roughly resembles bicycles today, with two wheels of equal size, initially with solid rubber tyres. These were typically equipped with a front spoon brake and no rear brake mechanism, but like penny-farthings they used fixed gears, allowing rear wheel braking by resisting the motion of the pedals. The relative fragility of the wooden rims used on most bicycles still precluded the use of rim brakes. Rim brakes and the freewheel were introduced in the late 1890s.

With the introduction of mass-produced pneumatic tyres by the Dunlop Tyre Company, the use of spoon brakes began to decline, as they tended to quickly wear through the thin casing of the new tyres. This problem led to demands for alternative braking systems. On November 23, 1897, Abram W. Duck of Duck's Cyclery in Oakland, California, was granted a patent for his Duck Roller Brake (U.S. Patent 594,234). The Duck brake used a rod operated by a lever on the handlebar to pull twin rubber rollers against the front tyre, braking the front wheel.

In 1898, after the advent of freewheel coasting mechanisms, the first internal coaster brakes were introduced for the rear wheel. The coaster brake was contained in the rear wheel hub, and was engaged and controlled by backpedaling, thus eliminating the issue of tyre wear. In the United States, the coaster brake was the most commonly fitted brake throughout the first half of the 20th century, often comprising the only braking system on the bicycle.

== Brake types ==
=== Spoon brakes ===
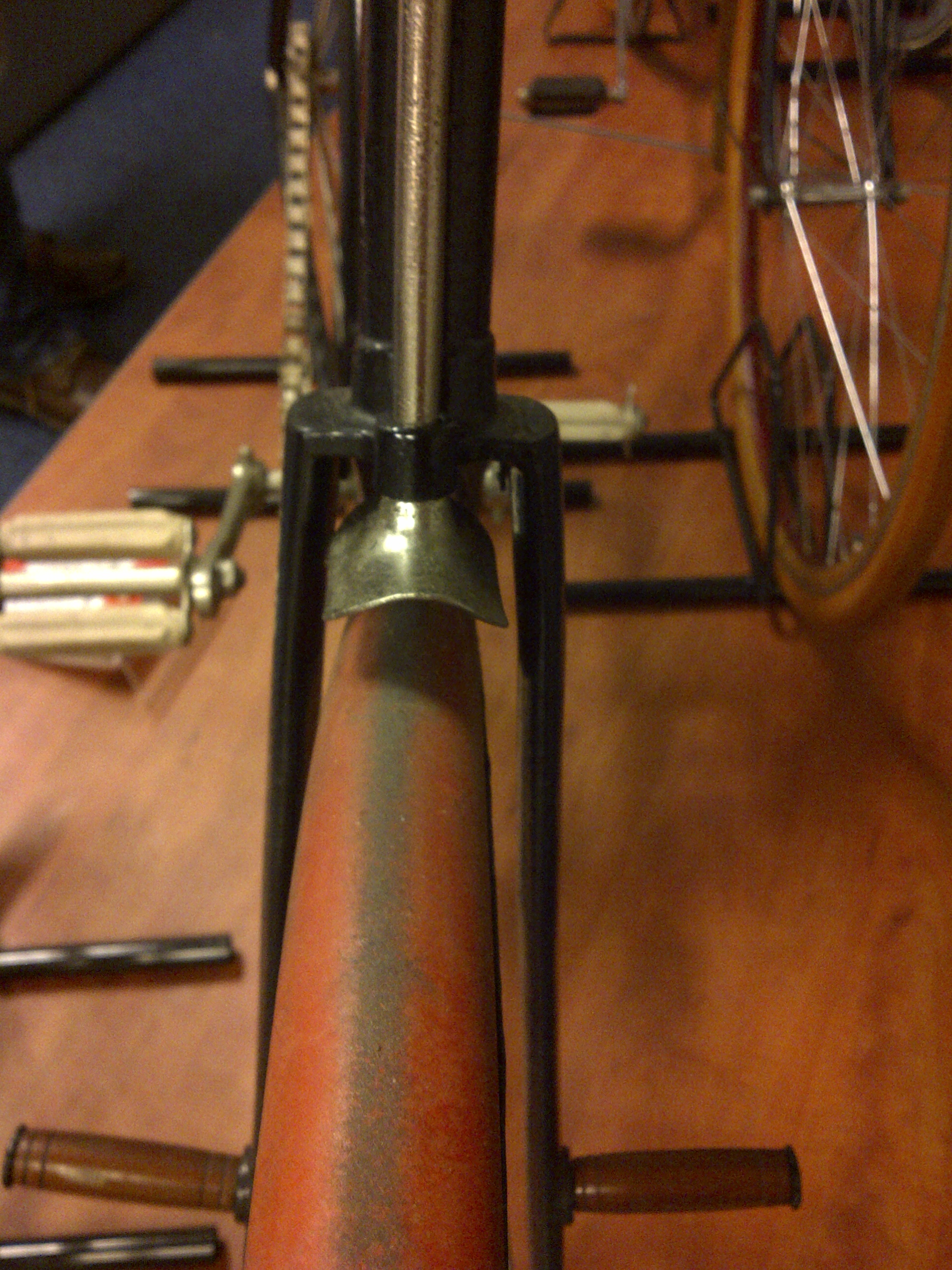
Spoon brake on antique Peugeot 'open diamond' frame 'Le Lion model B' at the Batavus Museum in Heerenveen, Netherlands

The spoon brake or plunger brake was probably the first type of bicycle brake and precedes the pneumatic tyre. Spoon brakes were used on penny farthings with solid rubber tyres in the 1800s and continued to be used after the introduction of the pneumatic-tyred safety bicycle. The spoon brake consists of a pad (often leather) or metal shoe (possibly rubber faced), which is pressed onto the top of the front tyre. These were almost always rod-operated by a right-hand lever. In developing countries, a foot-operated form of the spoon brake sometimes is retrofitted to old rod brake roadsters. It consists of a spring-loaded flap attached to the back of the fork crown. This is depressed against the front tyre by the rider's foot.

Perhaps more so than any other form of bicycle brake, the spoon brake is sensitive to road conditions and increases tyre wear dramatically.

Though made obsolete by the introduction of the Duck brake, coaster brake, and rod brake, spoon brakes continued to be used in the West supplementally on adult bicycles until the 1930s, and on children's bicycles until the 1950s. In the developing world, they were manufactured until much more recently.

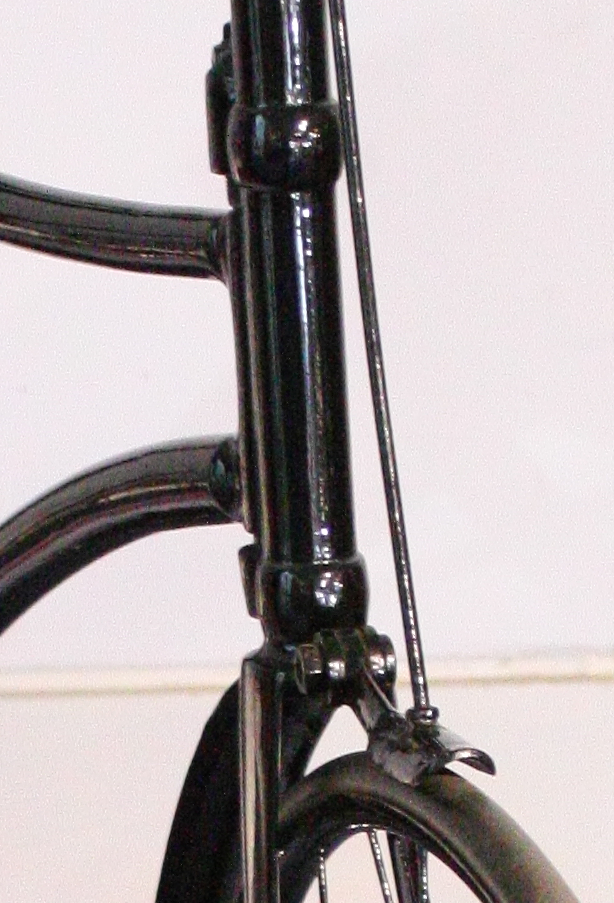
Spoon brake on front wheel of 1886 Swift Safety Bicycle at Coventry Transport Museum

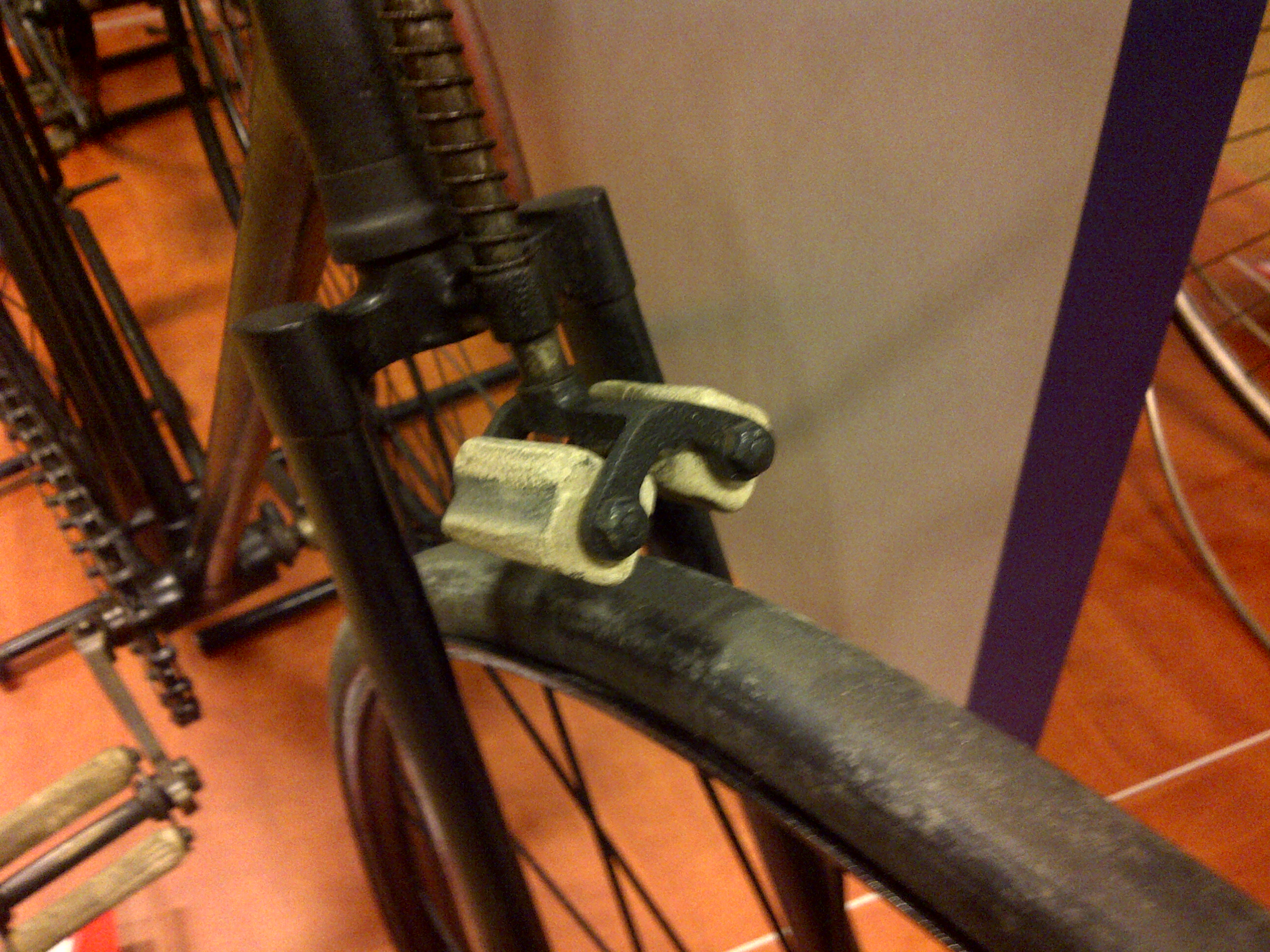
Spoon brake variation at the Batavus Museum in Heerenveen, Netherlands

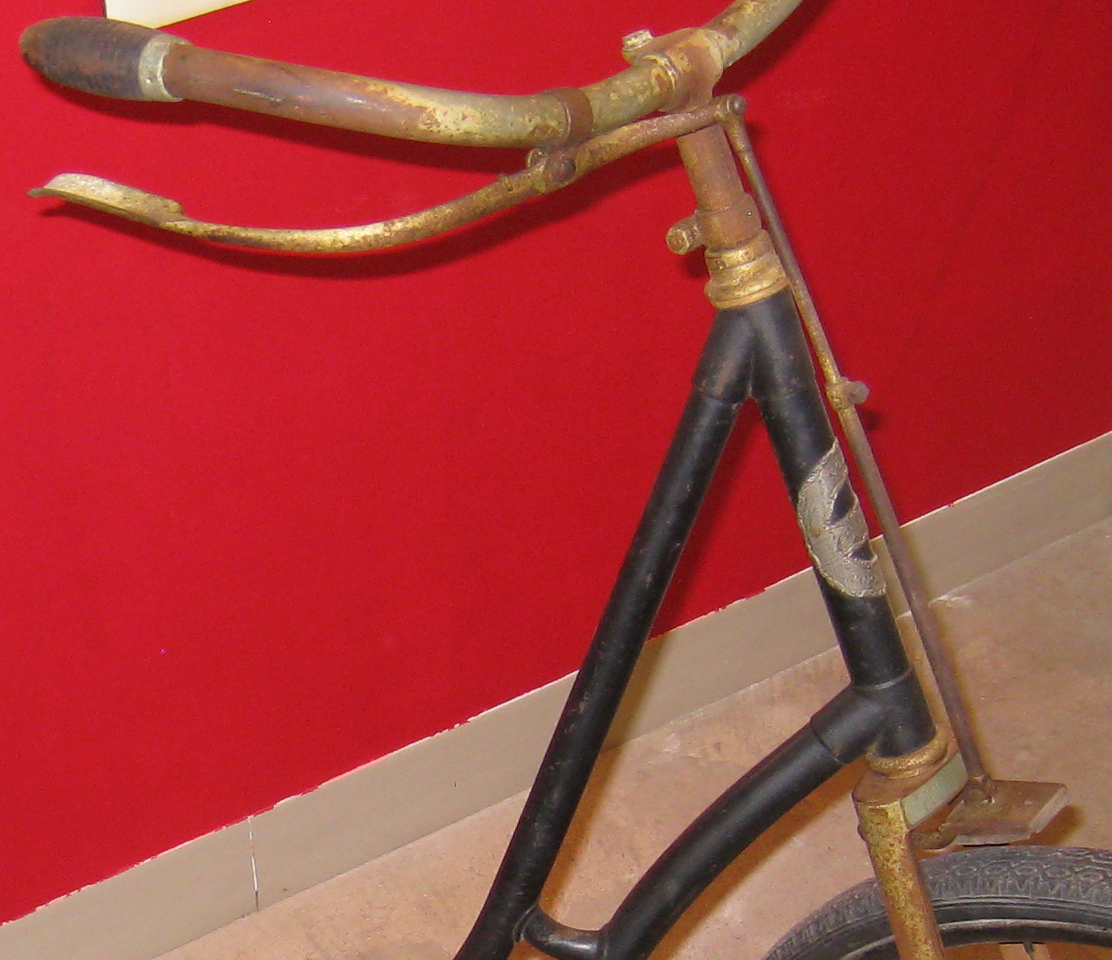
Bicycle spoon brake on 1898 Columbia Model 51 Ladies Chainless

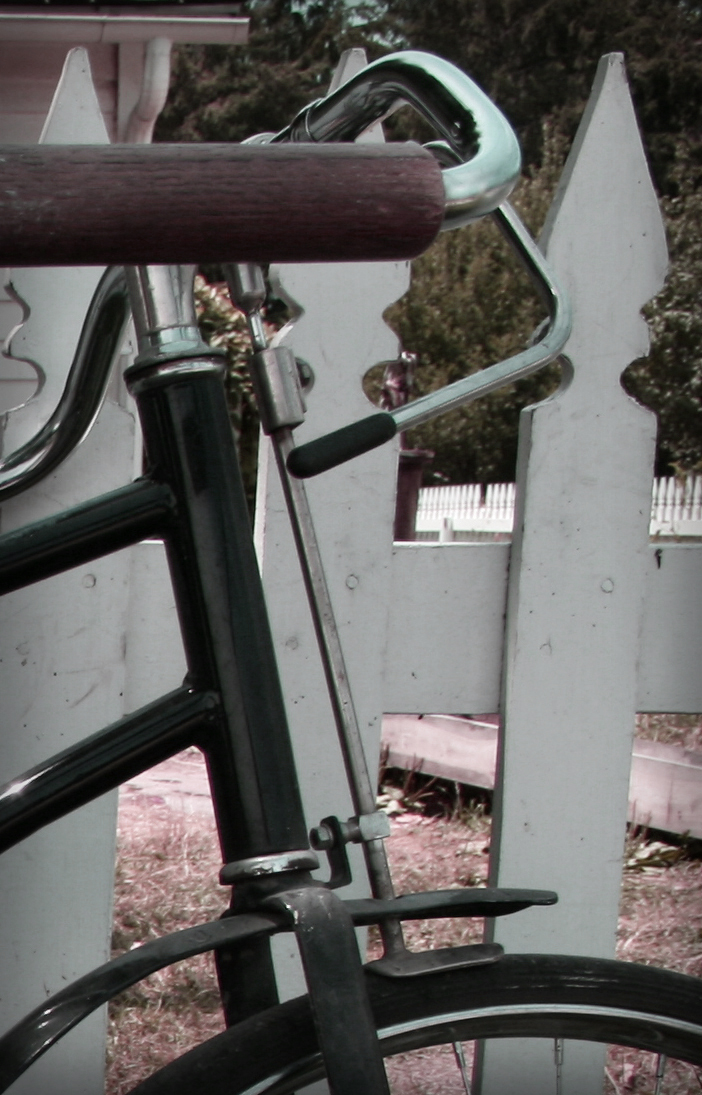
Spoon brake on front wheel

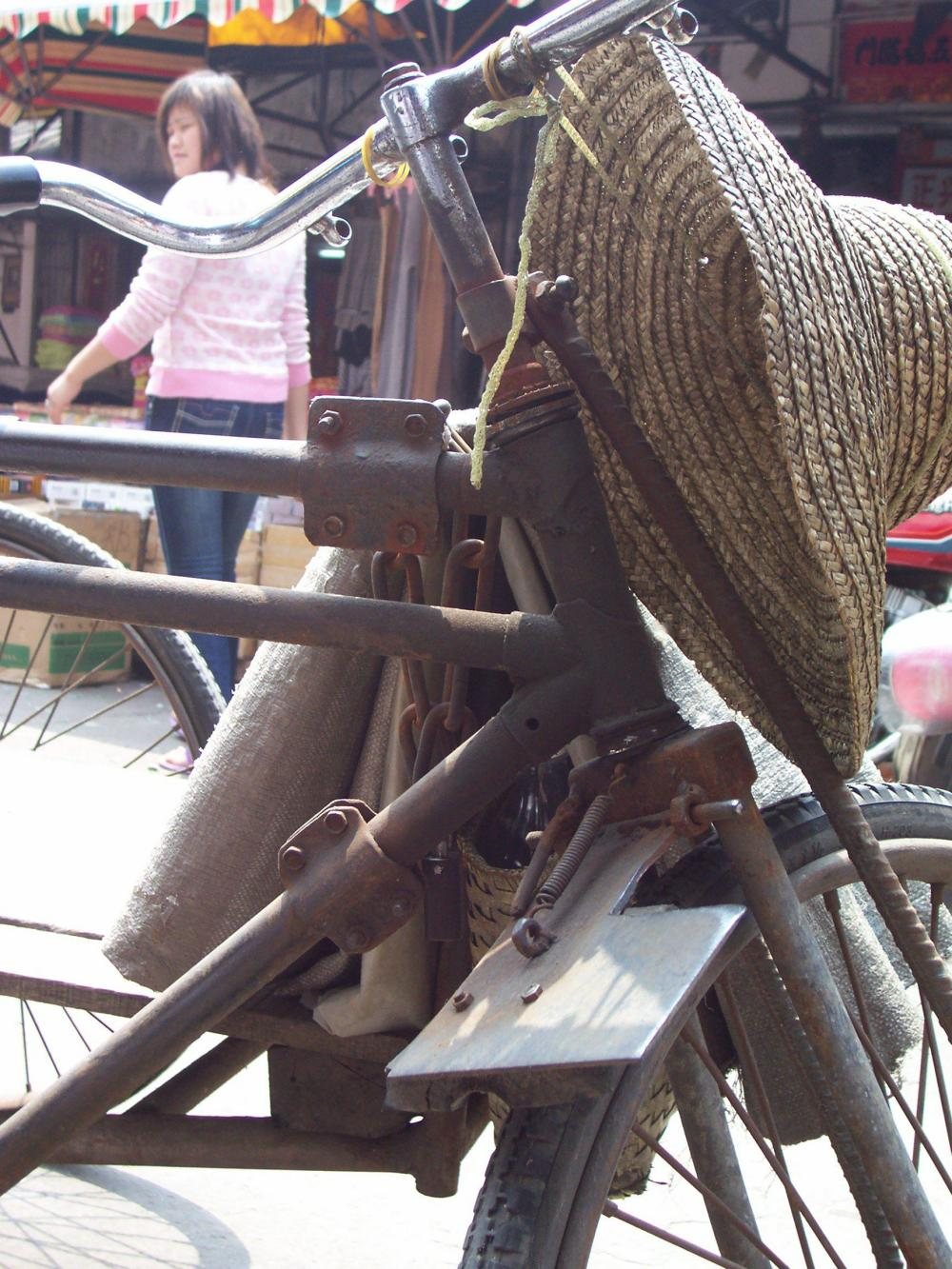
Improvised spoon brake on a Chinese cargo tricycle

=== Duck brake ===
Invented in 1897, the Duck brake or Duck roller brake used a rod operated by a lever on the handlebar to pull twin friction rollers (usually made of wood or rubber) against the front tyre. Mounted on axles secured by friction washers and set at an angle to conform to the shape of the tyre, the rollers were forced against their friction washers upon contacting the tyre, thus braking the front wheel. A tension spring held the rollers away from the tyre except when braking. Braking power was enhanced by an extra-long brake lever mounted in parallel with and behind the handlebar, which provided additional leverage when braking (two hands could be used to pull the lever if necessary). Used in combination with a rear coaster brake, a cyclist of the day could stop much more quickly and with better modulation of braking effort than was possible using only a spoon brake or rear coaster brake. Known colloquially as the duck brake, the design was used by many notable riders of the day, and was widely exported to England, Australia, and other countries. In 1902, Louis H. Bill was granted a patent for an improved version of the Duck Roller Brake (Patent 708,114) for use on motorized bicycles (motorcycles).

=== Rim brakes ===
Rim brakes are so called because braking force is applied by friction pads to the rim of the rotating wheel, thus slowing it and the bicycle. Brake pads can be made of leather, rubber, or cork and are often mounted in metal "shoes". Rim brakes are typically actuated by a lever mounted on the handlebar.

==== Advantages and disadvantages ====
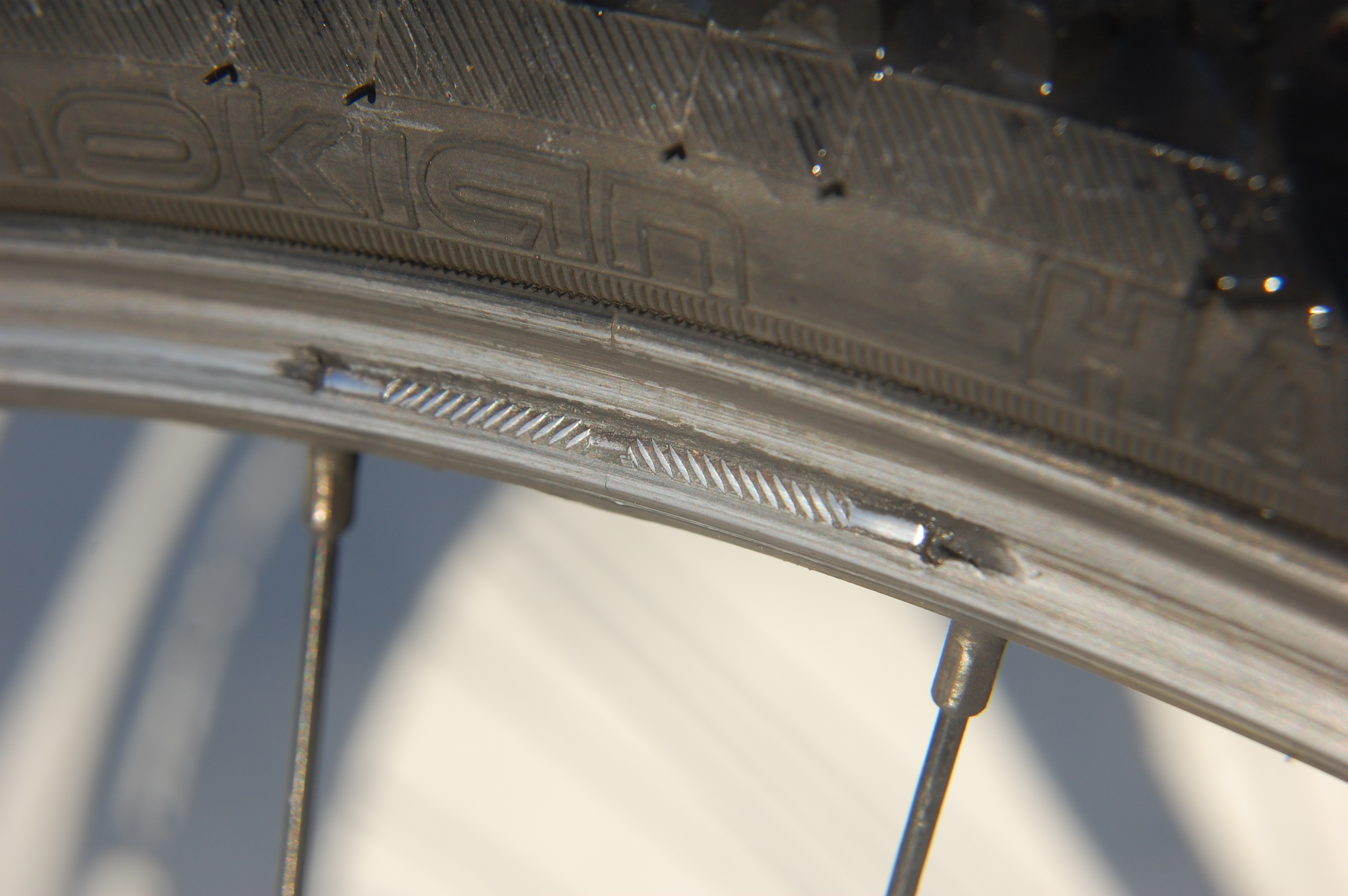
Aluminium rim worn out by V-brakes. The outer wall has been worn through and the wheel is dangerously weakened. This is a disadvantage of rim brakes.

Rim brakes are inexpensive, light, mechanically simple, easy to maintain, and powerful. However, they perform relatively poorly when the rims are wet, and will brake unevenly if the rims are even slightly warped. Because rims can carry debris from the ground to the brake pads, rim brakes are more prone to clogging with mud or snow than disc brakes (where braking surfaces are higher from the ground), particularly when riding on unpaved surfaces. The low price and ease of maintenance of rim brakes makes them popular in low- to mid-price commuter bikes, where the disadvantages are alleviated by the unchallenging conditions. The light weight of rim brakes also makes them desirable in road racing bicycles.

Rim brakes require regular maintenance. Brake pads wear down and have to be replaced. As they wear down, their position may need to be adjusted as the material wears away. Because the motion of most brakes is not perfectly horizontal, the pads may lose their centering as they wear, causing the pads to wear unevenly. Over longer time and use, rims can become worn. Rims should be checked for wear periodically as they can fail catastrophically if the braking surface becomes too worn. Wear is accelerated by wet and muddy conditions. Rim brakes require that the rims be straight (not out-of-round or warped). If a rim has a pronounced wobble, then the braking force may be intermittent or uneven, and the pads may rub the rims even when the brake is not applied.

During braking, the friction surfaces (brake pads and rims) will experience thermal heating. In normal use this is not a problem, as the brakes are applied with limited force and for a short time, so the heat quickly dissipates to the surrounding air. However, on a heavily laden bike on a long descent, heat energy may be added more quickly than it can dissipate causing heat build-up, which may damage components and cause brake failure.

A ceramic coating for the rims is available which may reduce wear and can also improve both wet and dry braking. It may also slightly reduce heat transfer to the inside of the rims because it is a thermal insulator.

==== Brake pads ====
Brake pads are available with numerous shapes and materials. Many consist of a replaceable rubber pad held on a mounting, or brake shoe, with a post or bolt on the back to attach to the brake. Some are made as one piece with the attachment directly molded in the pad for lower production costs; brake pads of the cartridge type are held in place by a metal split pin or threaded grub screw and can be replaced without moving the brake shoe from its alignment to the rim. The rubber can be softer for more braking force with less lever effort, or harder for longer life. Many pad designs have a rectangular shape; others are longer and curved to match the radius of the rim. Larger pads do not necessarily provide more braking force, but will wear more slowly (in relation to thickness), so can usually be thinner. In general, a brake can be fitted with a variety of pads, as long as the mounting is compatible. Carbon fiber rims may be more sensitive to damage by incorrectly matched brake pads, and generally must use non-abrasive cork pads.

Ceramic-coated rims should be used with special pads because of heat build-up at the pad-rim interface; standard pads can leave a "glaze" on the ceramic braking surface, reducing its inherent roughness and leading to a severe drop in wet-weather braking performance. Ceramic pads usually contain chromium compounds to resist heat.

For wet-weather use, brake pads containing iron (iii) oxide are sometimes used as these have higher friction on a wet aluminum rim than the usual rubber. These salmon-colored pads were first made by Scott-Mathauser and are now produced by Kool-Stop.

To minimise excessive rim wear, a brake pad should be hard enough that it does not embed road grit or chips of rim metal in the face of the pad, since these act as grinding/gouging agents and markedly reduce rim life.

==== Types of rim brakes ====
The following are among the many sub-types of rim brakes:

===== Rod-actuated brakes =====
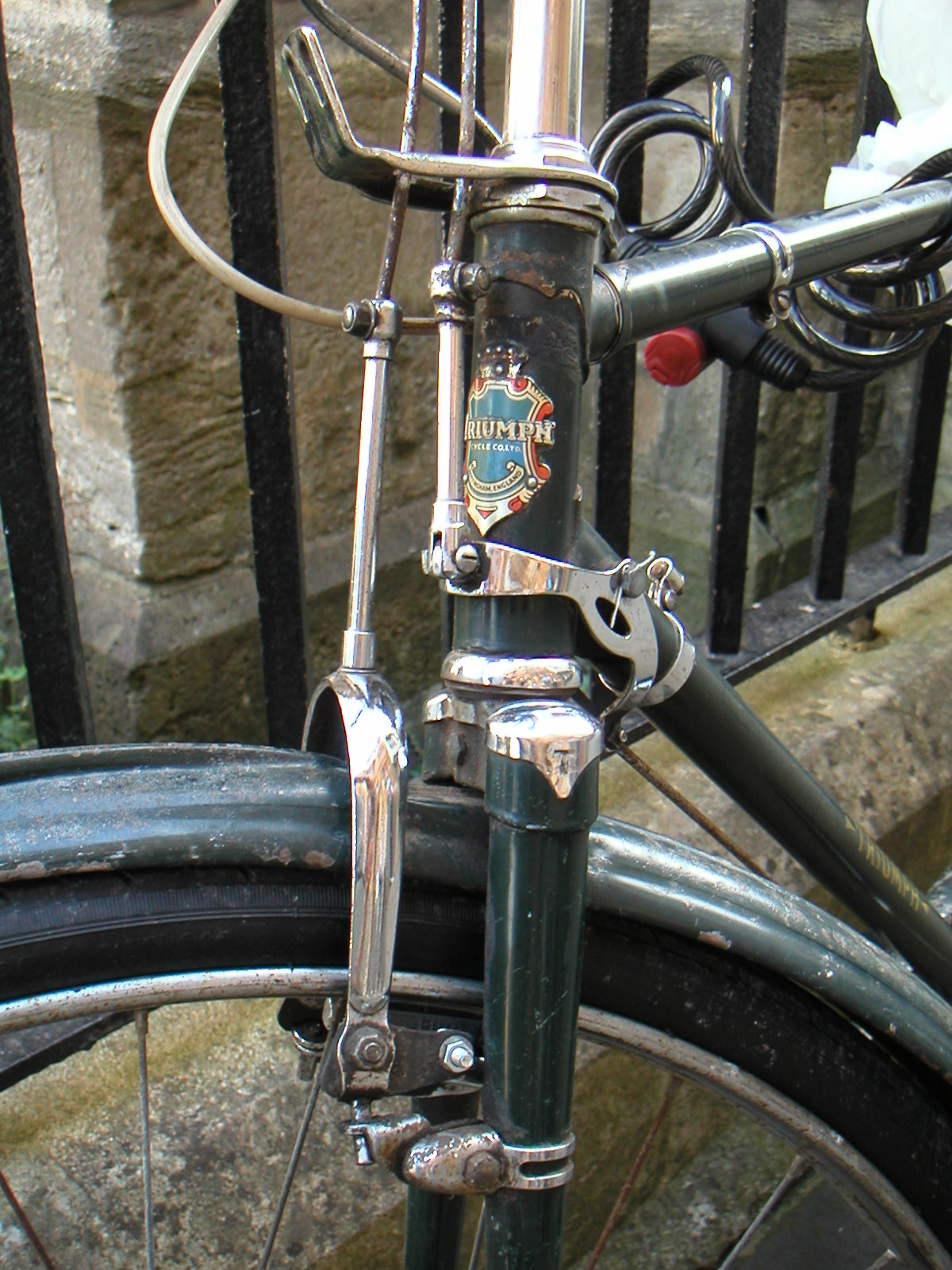
Rod brake system. Lateral play in the pivot for the rear brake rod allows for rotation of the handlebar

The rod-actuated brake, or simply rod brake (roller lever brake in Raleigh terminology), uses a series of rods and pivots, rather than Bowden cables, to transmit force applied to a hand lever to pull friction pads upwards against the inner surface, which faces the hub, of the wheel rim. They were often called "stirrup brakes" due to their shape. Rod brakes are used with a rim profile known as the Westwood rim, which has a slightly concave area on the braking surface and lacks the flat outer surface required by brakes that apply the pads on opposite sides of the rim.

The rear linkage mechanism is complicated by the need to allow rotation where the fork and handlebars attach to the frame. A common setup was to combine a front rod brake with a rear coaster brake. Although heavy and complex, the linkages are reliable and durable and can be repaired or adjusted with simple hand tools. The design is still in use, typically on African and Asian roadsters such as the Sohrab and Flying Pigeon.

===== Caliper brakes =====
The caliper brake is a class of cable-actuated brake in which the brake mounts to a single point above the wheel, theoretically allowing the arms to auto-centre on the rim. Arms extend around the tyre and end in brake shoes that press against the rim. While some designs incorporate dual pivot points — the arms pivot on a sub-frame — the entire assembly still mounts to a single point.

Caliper brakes tend to become less effective as tyres get wider, and so deeper, reducing the brakes' mechanical advantage. Thus caliper brakes are rarely found on modern mountain bikes. But they are almost ubiquitous on road bikes, particularly the dual-pivot side-pull caliper brake.

===== Side-pull caliper brakes =====
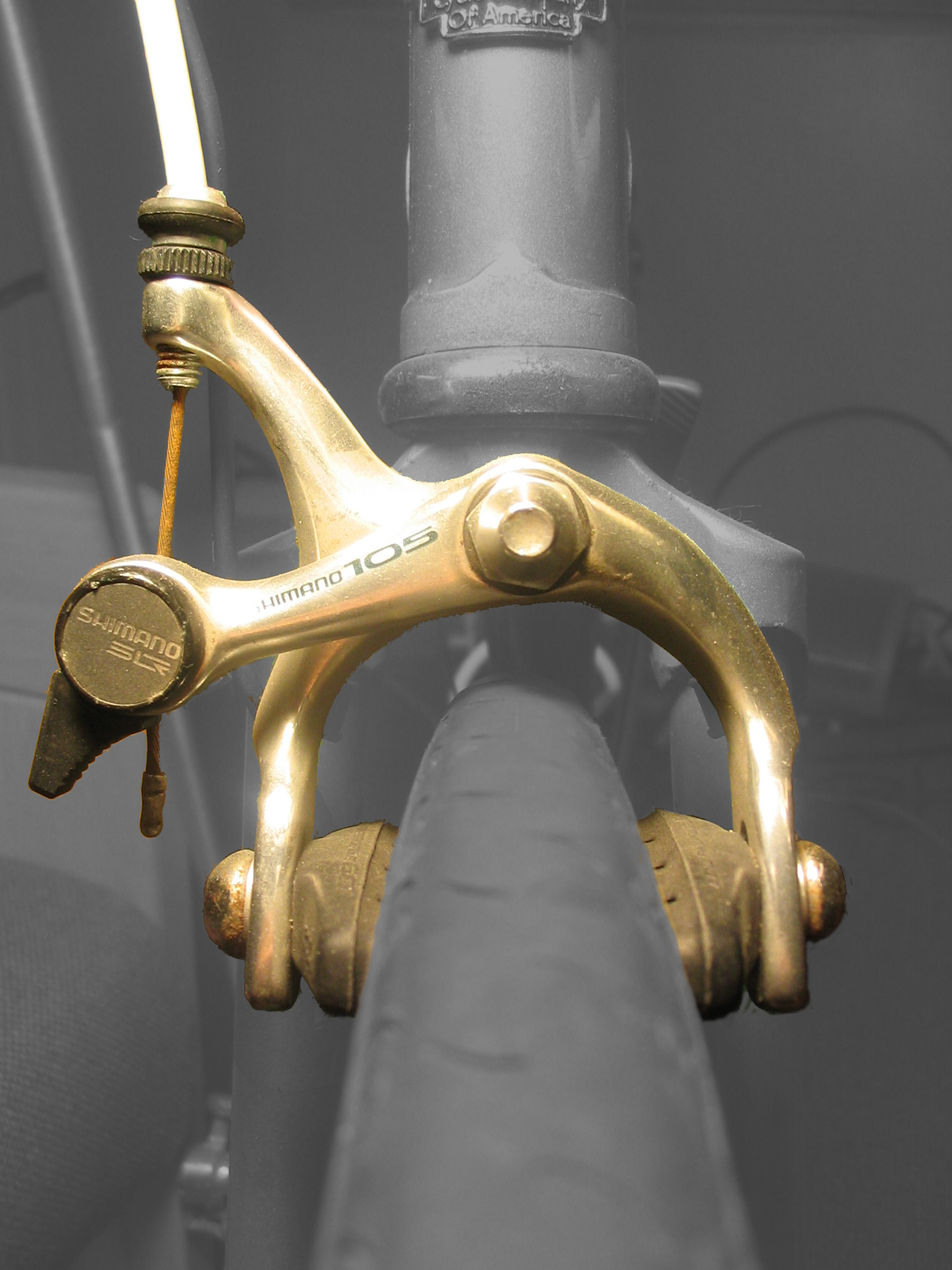
Single pivot side-pull caliper brake.

Single-pivot side-pull caliper brakes consist of two curved arms that cross at a pivot above the wheel and hold the brake pads on opposite sides of the rim. These arms have extensions on one side, one attached to the cable, the other to the cable housing. When the brake lever is squeezed, the arms move together and the brake pads squeeze the rim.

These brakes are simple and effective for relatively narrow tyres but have significant flex and resulting poor performance if the arms are made long enough to fit wide tyres. If not adjusted properly, low quality varieties tend to rotate to one side during actuation and tend to stay there, making it difficult to evenly space brake shoes away from the rim. These brakes are now used on inexpensive bikes; before the introduction of dual-pivot caliper brakes they were used on all types of road bikes.

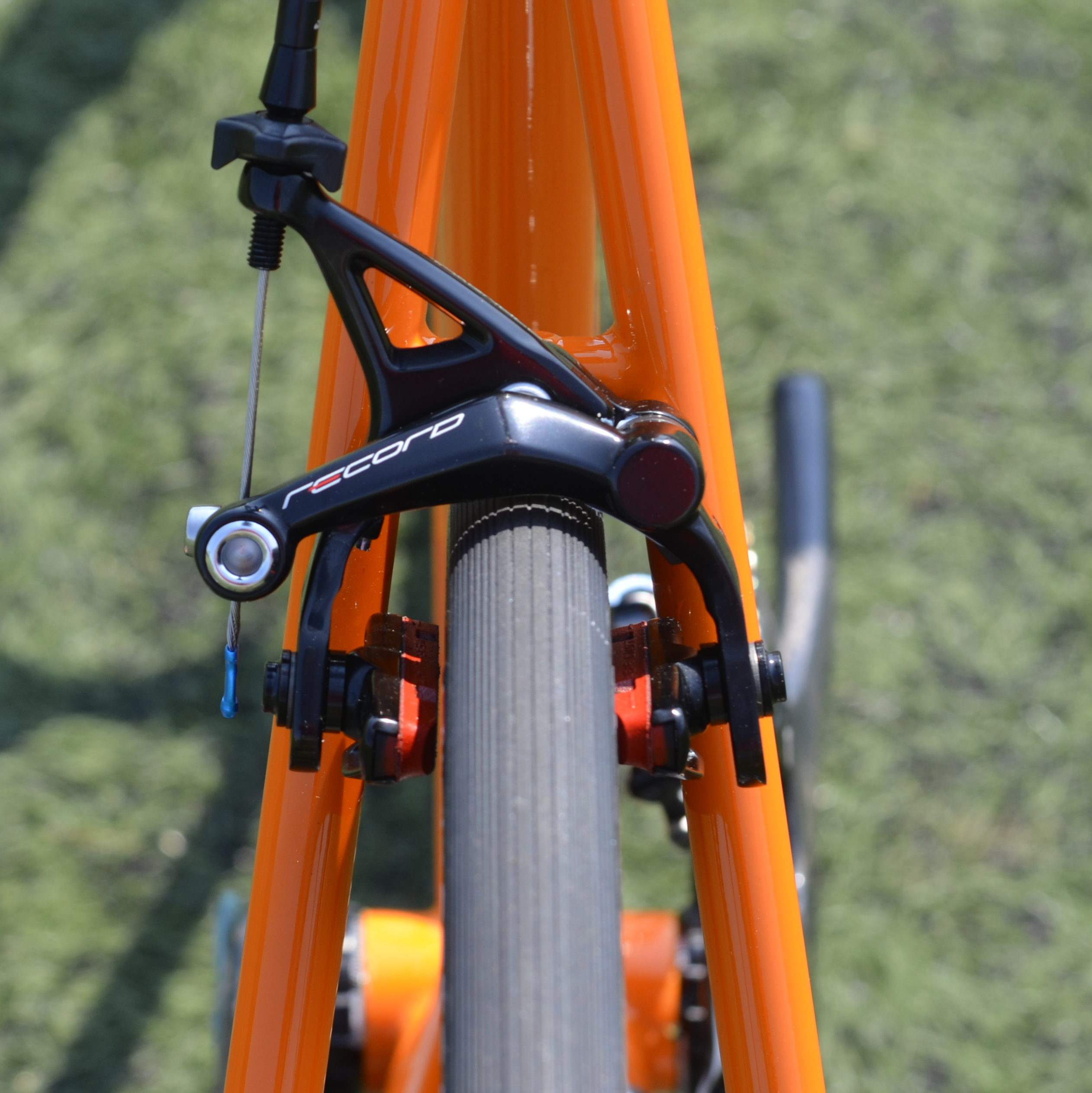
Dual-pivot caliper brake.

Dual-pivot side-pull caliper brakes are used on most modern racing bicycles. One arm pivots at the centre, like a side-pull; and the other pivots at the side, like a centre-pull. The cable housing attaches like that of a side-pull brake. These brakes offer a higher mechanical advantage, and result in better braking. Dual-pivot brakes are slightly heavier than conventional side-pull calipers and cannot accurately track an out-of-true rim, or a wheel that flexes from side to side in the frame during hard climbing. It is common to see professional racers climbing mountains with the quick-release undone on the rear brake, to eliminate drag from this source.

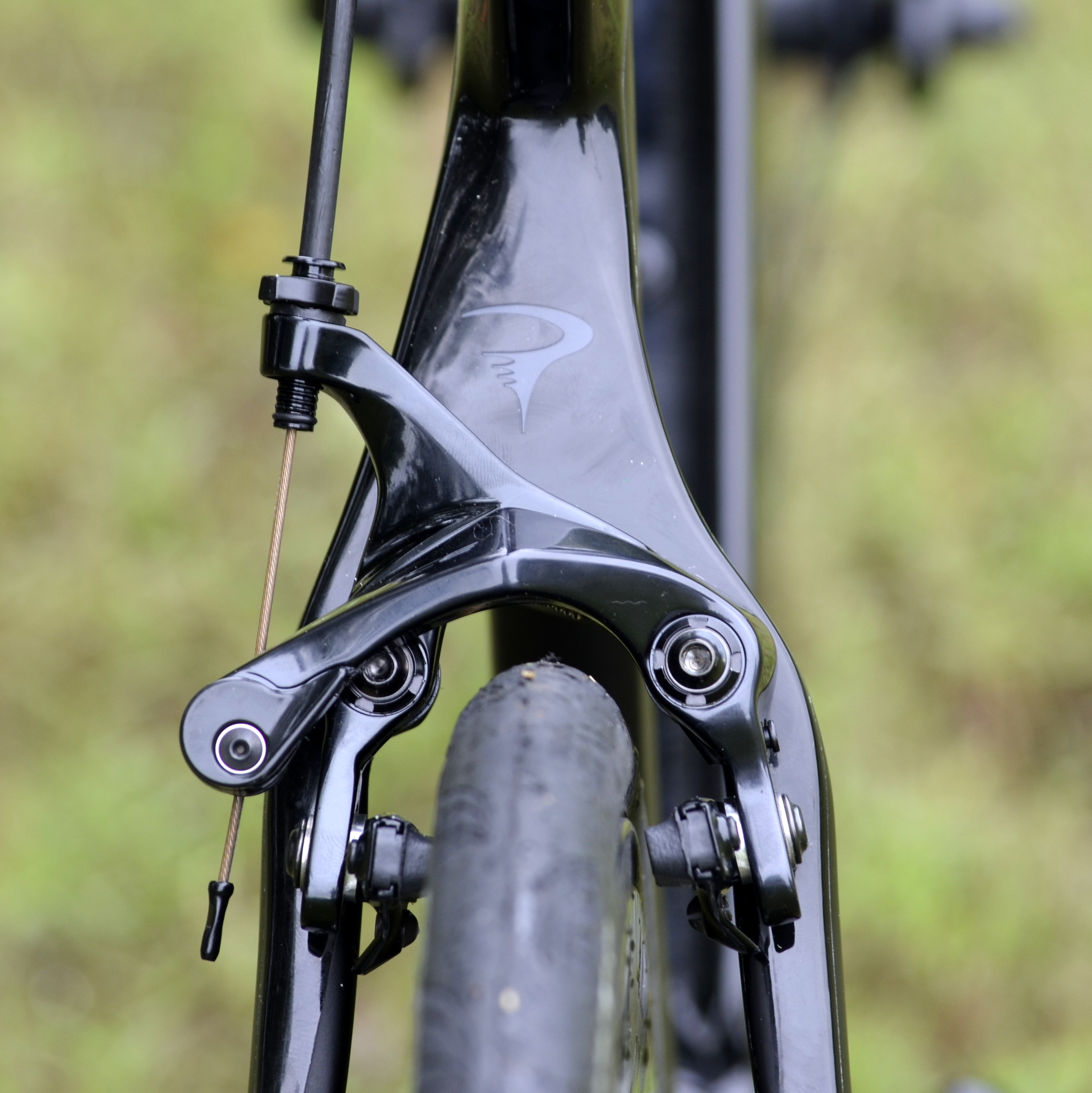
Direct mount side pull brakes.

Direct mount rim brakes employ two mounting points, increasing stiffness and braking power. It was developed by Shimano and released as an open standard. Individual mounting points for each arm ease the centering of side-pull brakes, and accommodate tire widths of 30 mm and more.

===== Centre-pull caliper brakes =====
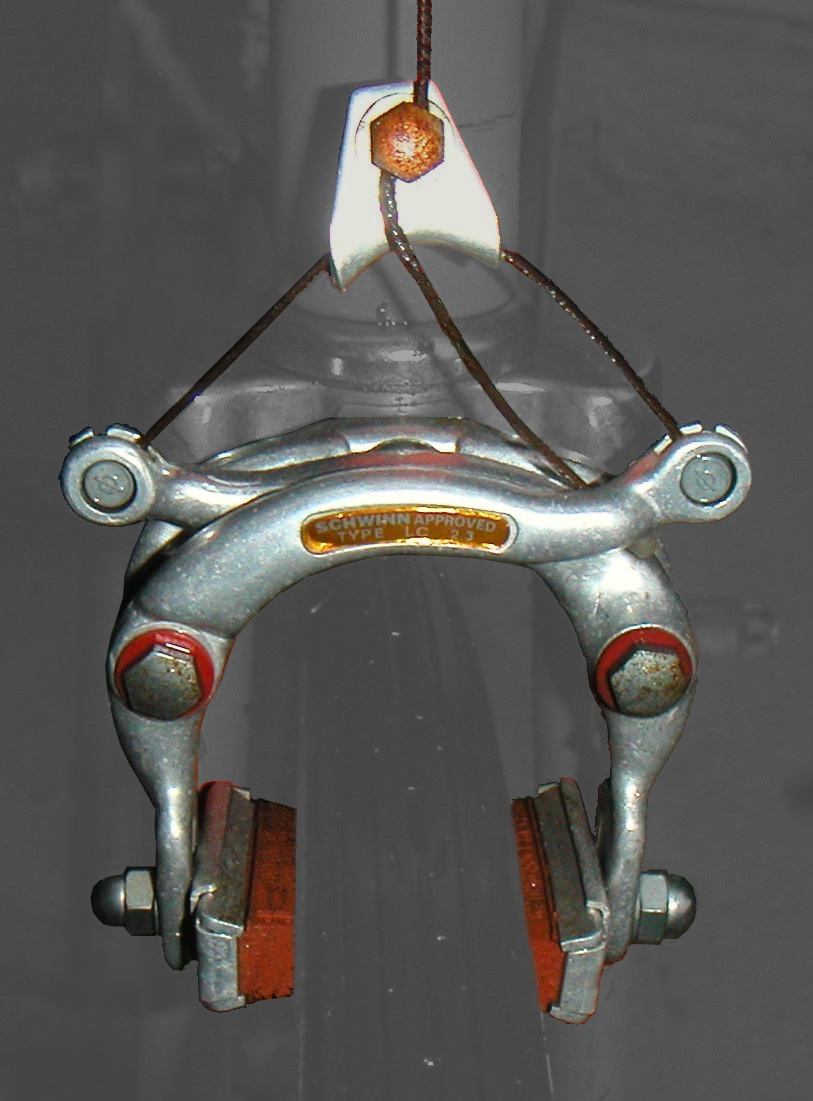
Centre-pull caliper brake.

Centre-pull caliper brakes have symmetrical arms and therefore centre more effectively. The cable housing attaches to a fixed cable stop attached to the frame, and the inner cable bolts to a sliding piece (called a "braking delta", "braking triangle", or "yoke") or a small pulley, over which runs a straddle cable connecting the two brake arms. Tension on the cable is evenly distributed to the two arms, preventing the brake from taking a "set" to one side or the other.

These brakes were reasonably priced, and in the past filled the price niche between the cheaper and the more expensive models of side-pull brakes. They are more effective than side-pull brakes in long reach applications as the distance between the pivot and brake pad or cable attachment is much shorter, reducing flex. It is important that the fixed bridge holding the pivots is very stiff.

===== U-brakes =====
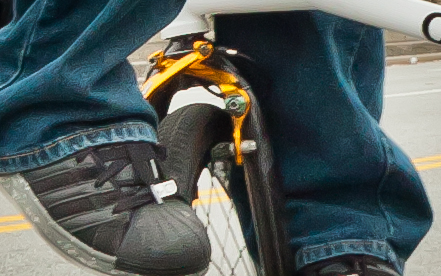
U-brake on a freestyle BMX bike

U-brakes (also known by the trademarked term 990-style) are essentially the same design as the centre-pull caliper brake. The difference is that the two arm pivots attach directly to the frame or fork while those of the centre-pull caliper brake attach to an integral bridge frame that mounts to the frame or fork by a single bolt. Like roller cam brakes, this is a caliper design with pivots located above the rim. Thus U-brakes are often interchangeable with, and have the same maintenance issues as, roller cam brakes.

U-brakes were used on mountain bikes through the mid-to-late 1980s, particularly under the chain stays, a rear brake mounting location that was then popular. This location usually benefits from higher frame stiffness, an important consideration with a powerful brake since flex in the stays will increase lever travel and reduce effective braking force. Unfortunately it is also very prone to clogging by mud, which meant that U-brakes quickly fell out of favour on cross-country bikes.

U-brakes are the current standard on Freestyle BMX frames and forks. The U-brake's main advantage over cantilever and linear-pull brakes in this application is that sideways protrusion of the brake and cable system is minimal, and the exposed parts are smooth. This is especially valuable on freestyle BMX bikes where any protruding parts are susceptible to damage and may interfere with the rider's body or clothing.

===== Cantilever brakes =====
The cantilever brake is a class of brake in which each arm is attached to a separate pivot point on one side of the seat stay or fork. Thus all cantilever brakes are dual-pivot. Both first- and second-class lever designs exist; second-class is by far the more common. In the second-class lever design, the arm pivots below the rim. The brake shoe is mounted above the pivot and is pressed against the rim as the two arms are drawn together. In the first-class lever design, the arm pivots above the rim. The brake shoe is mounted below the pivot and is pressed against the rim as the two arms are forced apart.

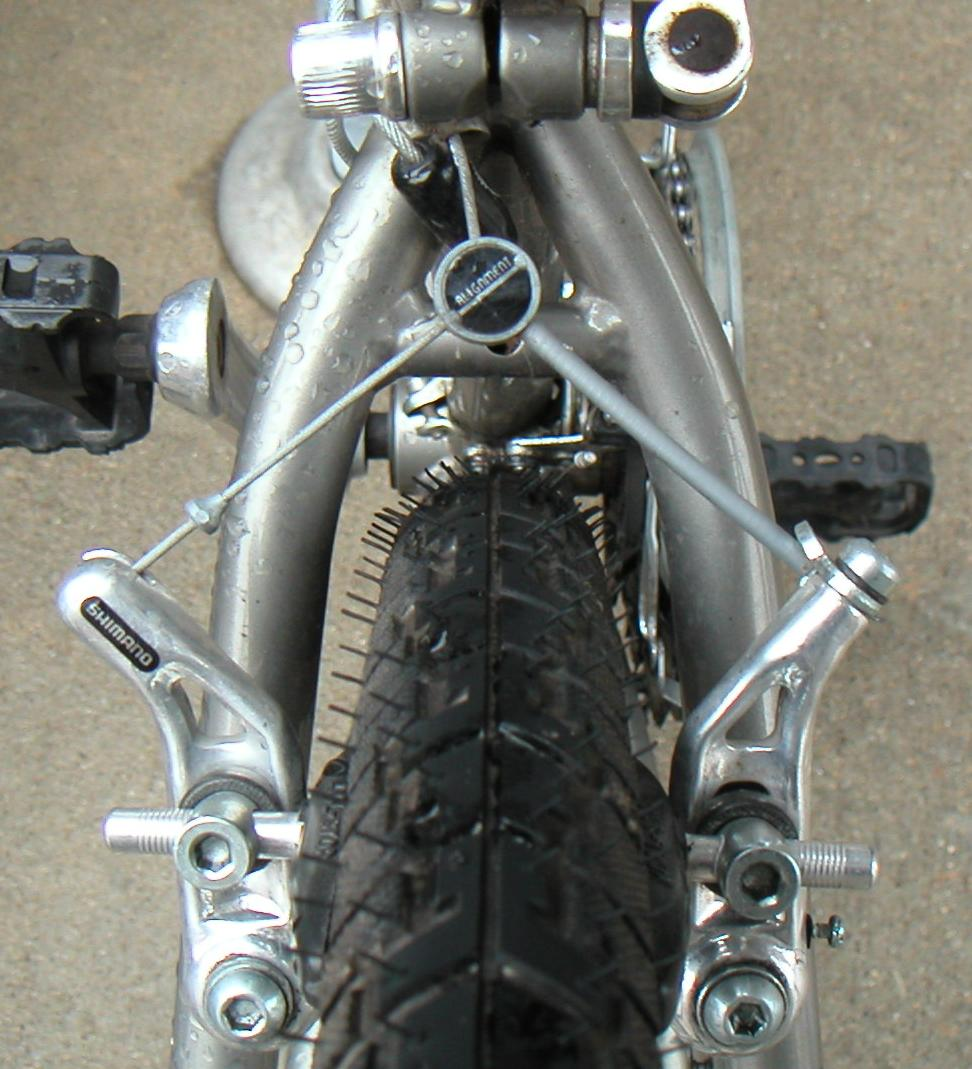
Low profile 'traditional' cantilever brake.

Due to a wider possible distance between the mounts and pads, cantilever brakes are often preferred for bicycles that use wide tyres, such as on mountain bikes. Because the arms move only in their designed arcs, the brake shoe must be adjustable in several planes. Thus cantilever brake shoes are notoriously difficult to adjust. As the brake shoes of a second-class cantilever brake wears, they ride lower on the rim. Eventually, one may go underneath the rim, so that the brake does not function.

There are several brake types based on the cantilever brake design: cantilever brakes and direct-pull brakes – both second class lever designs – and roller cam brakes and U-brakes – both first class lever designs.

===== Traditional cantilever brakes =====
Traditional cantilever brakes pre-date the direct-pull brake. It is a centre-pull cantilever design with an outwardly angled arm protruding on each side, a cable stop on the frame or fork to terminate the cable housing, and a straddle cable between the arms similar to centre-pull caliper brakes. The cable from the brake lever pulls upwards on the straddle cable, causing the brake arms to rotate up and inward thus squeezing the rim between the brake pads.

Originally, cantilever brakes had nearly horizontal arms and were designed for maximum clearance on touring or cyclo-cross bicycles. When the mountain bike became popular, cantilever brakes were adopted for these too, but the smaller MTB frames meant that riders often fouled the rear brake arms with their heels. "Low profile" cantilevers were designed to overcome this, where the arms are closer to 45 degrees from horizontal. Low profile brakes require more careful attention to cable geometry than traditional cantilevers but are now the most common type.

Traditional cantilever brakes are difficult to adapt to bicycle suspension and protrude somewhat from the frame. Accordingly, they are usually found only on bicycles without suspension.

===== V-brakes =====
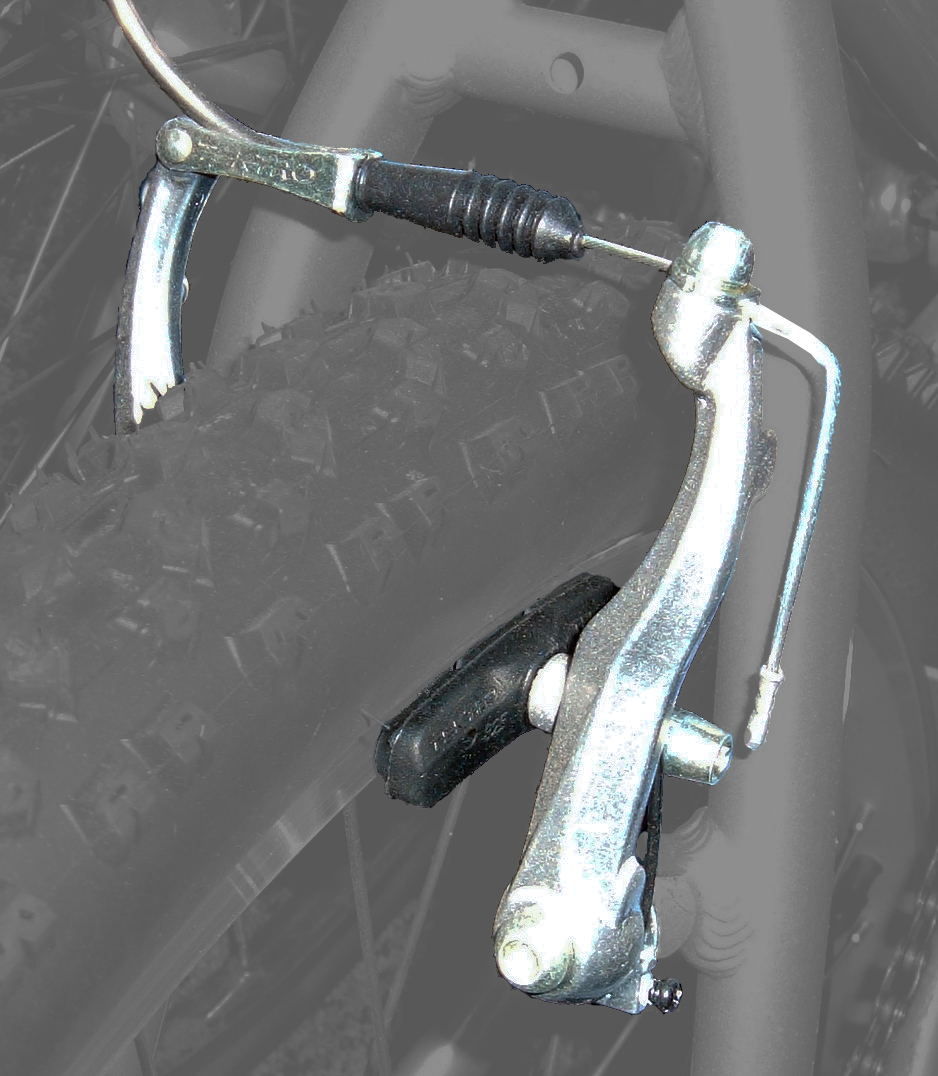
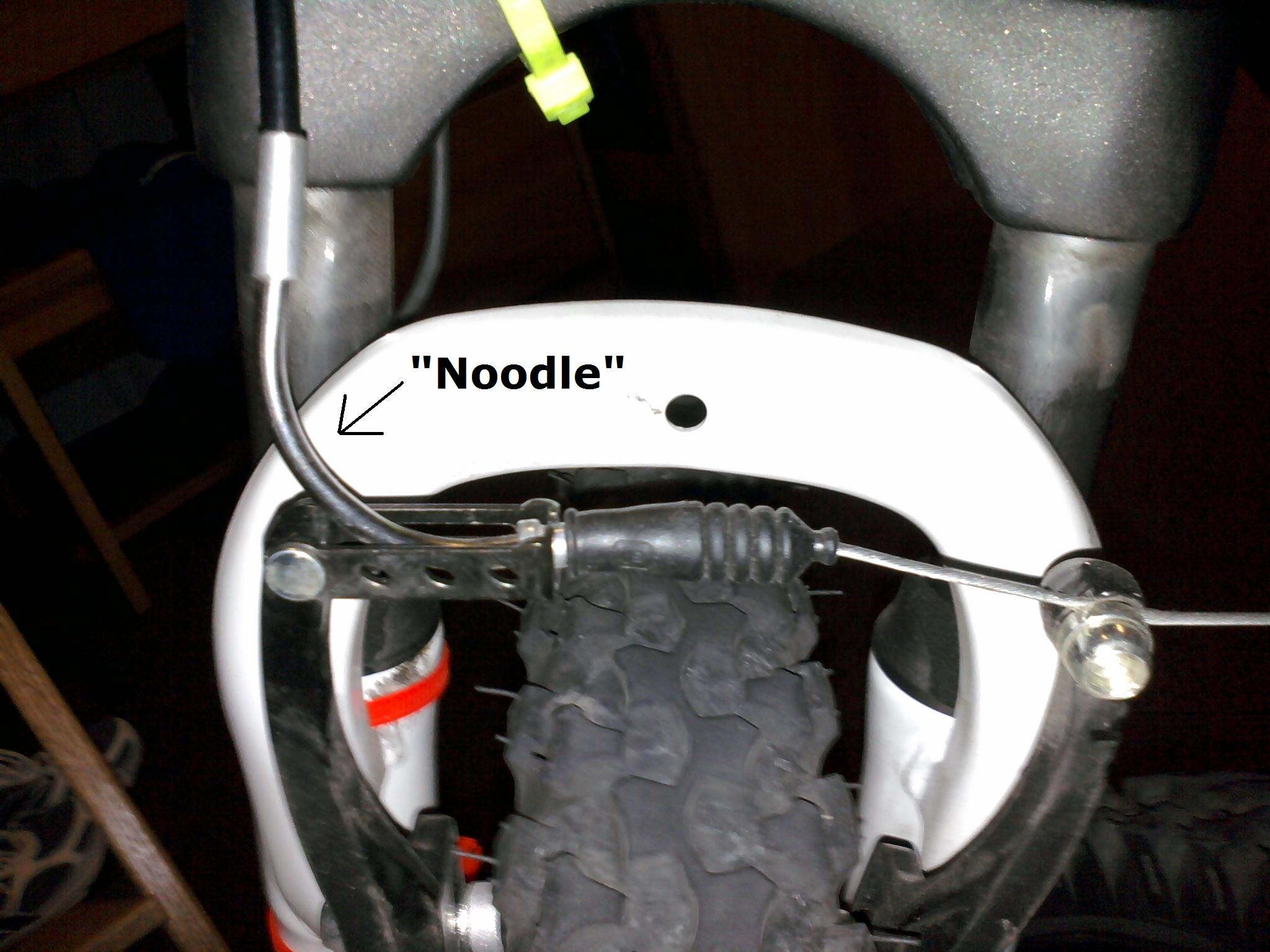
Linear-pull brake on rear wheel of a mountain bike (left). A noodle; the bellows is directly above the tyre (right).

Linear-pull brakes or direct-pull brakes, commonly referred to by Shimano's trademark V-brakes, are a side-pull version of cantilever brakes and mount on the same frame bosses. However, the arms are longer, with the cable housing attached to one arm and the cable to the other. As the cable pulls against the housing, the arms are drawn together. Because the housing enters from vertically above one arm yet force must be transmitted laterally between arms, the flexible housing is extended by a rigid tube with a 90° bend known as the "noodle" (a noodle with a 135° bend is used where the front brake is operated by the right hand, as this gives a smoother curve in the cable housing). The noodle is seated in a stirrup attached to the arm. A flexible bellows often covers the exposed cable.

Since there is no intervening mechanism between the cable and the arms, the design is called "direct-pull". And since the arms move the same distance that the cable moves with regard to its housing, the design is also called "linear-pull". The term "V-brake" is trademarked by Shimano and represents the most popular implementation of this design. Some high-end V-brakes use a four-pivot parallel motion so the brake pads contact at virtually the same position on the wheel rim regardless of wear.

V-brakes function well with the suspension systems found on many mountain bikes because they do not require a separate cable stop on the frame or fork. Because of the higher mechanical advantage of V-brakes, they require brake levers with longer cable travel than levers intended for older types of brakes. Mechanical (i.e. cable-actuated) disc brakes use the same amount of cable travel as V-brakes, except for those that are described as being "road" specific. As a general rule, mechanical disc brakes for so-called "flat bar" bicycles (chiefly mountain and hybrid bicycles) are compatible with V-brake levers, whereas mechanical disc brakes intended for "drop-bar" bicycles are compatible with the cable pull of older brake designs (cantilever, caliper, and U-brake).

Poorly designed V-brakes can suffer from a sudden failure when the noodle end pulls through the metal stirrup, leaving the wheel with no braking power. Although the noodle can be regarded as a service item and changed regularly, the hole in the stirrup may enlarge through wear. The stirrup cannot normally be replaced, so good-quality V-brakes use a durable metal for the stirrup.

Mini V-brakes (or mini Vs) are V-brakes with shorter arms, typically between 8 and 9 centimeters. This reduces the required cable pull, making them compatible with brake levers intended for cantilever brakes. Mini V-brakes retain advantages specific to V-brakes such as not requiring extra cable stops. On the downside, their shorter arms provide very small tyre and wheel clearance and generally make for a less forgiving setup: they can only accommodate smaller tyre sizes compared to cantilever brakes, may pose problems for mounting fenders, can be clogged more easily by mud, and they can make it harder to change wheels.

V-brakes always use thin and relatively long brake pads. The thin pads ease wheel removal, which is achieved by pushing the arms together and unhooking the noodle from the stirrup. The additional length gives good pad life by compensating for the thinner material depth.

===== Roller cam brakes =====
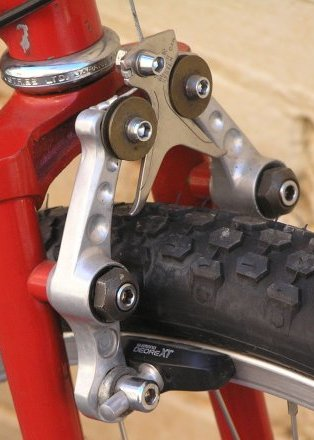
Roller cam front brake

Roller cam brakes are centre-pull cantilever brakes actuated by the cable pulling a single two-sided sliding cam. (First- and second-class lever designs exist; first-class is most common and is described here.) Each arm has a cam follower. As the cam presses against the follower it forces the arms apart. As the top of each arm moves outward, the brake shoe below the pivot is forced inward against the rim. There is much in favor of the roller cam brake design. Since the cam controls the rate of closure, the clamping force can be made non-linear with the pull. And since the design can provide positive mechanical advantage, maximum clamping force can be higher than that of other types of brakes. They are known for being strong and controllable. On the downside, they require some skill to set up and can complicate wheel changes. They also require maintenance: like U-brakes, as the pad wears it strikes the rim higher; unless re-adjusted it can eventually contact the tyre's sidewall.

The roller cam design was first developed by Charlie Cunningham of WTB around 1982 and licensed to Suntour. Roller cam brakes were used on early mountain bikes in the 1980s and into the 1990s, mounted to the fork blades and seat stays in the standard locations, as well as below the chain stays for improved stiffness as they do not protrude to interfere with the crank. It is not unusual for a bicycle to have a single roller cam brake (or U-brake) combined with another type. They are still used on some BMX and recumbent bicycles.

There are two rare variants that use the roller cam principle. For locations where centre-pull is inappropriate, the side-pull toggle cam brake was developed. Also a first-class cantilever, it uses a single-sided sliding cam (the toggle) against one arm that is attached by a link to the other arm. As the cam presses against the follower, the force is also transmitted to the other arm via the link. And specifically for suspension forks where the housing must terminate at the brake frame, the side-pull "sabre cam brake" was developed. In the sabre cam design, the cable end is fixed and the housing moves the single-sided cam.

===== Delta brakes =====
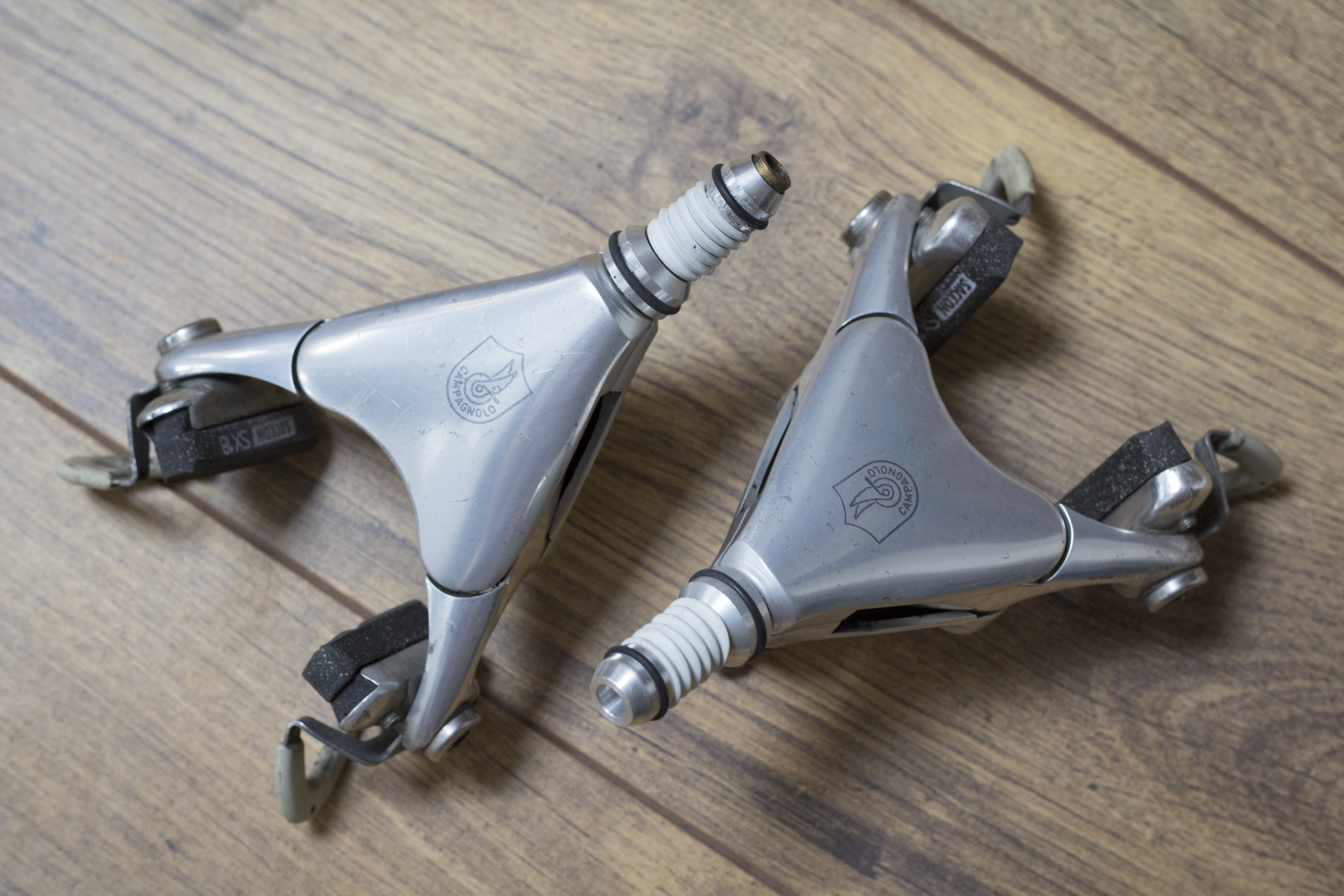
A pair of Campagnolo delta brakes

The delta brake is a road bicycle brake named due to its triangular shape. The cable enters at the centre, pulls a corner of a parallelogram linkage housed inside the brake across two opposite corners, pushing out at the other two corners on to the brake arms above the pivots, so that the arms below the pivots push pads in against the rim. A feature of the design is that the mechanical advantage varies as a tangent function across its range, where that of most other designs remains fixed.

Many consider the brake attractive, and it has a lower wind profile than some other common brakes. However, Bicycle Quarterly criticized the delta brake for being heavy, giving mediocre stopping power, and suffering disadvantageous variable mechanical advantage. In particular, with a small parallelogram, pad wear causes mechanical advantage to rise dramatically. However, with high leverage, the stroke of the lever is not enough to fully apply the brake, so the rider can have brakes that feel normal in light braking but which cannot be applied harder for hard braking.

The basic design dates from at least the 1930s. They were made most prominently by Campagnolo in 1985, but brakes based on the same mechanism were also manufactured by Modolo (Kronos), Weinmann, and others. They are no longer made and are now uncommon.

===== Hydraulic rim brakes =====
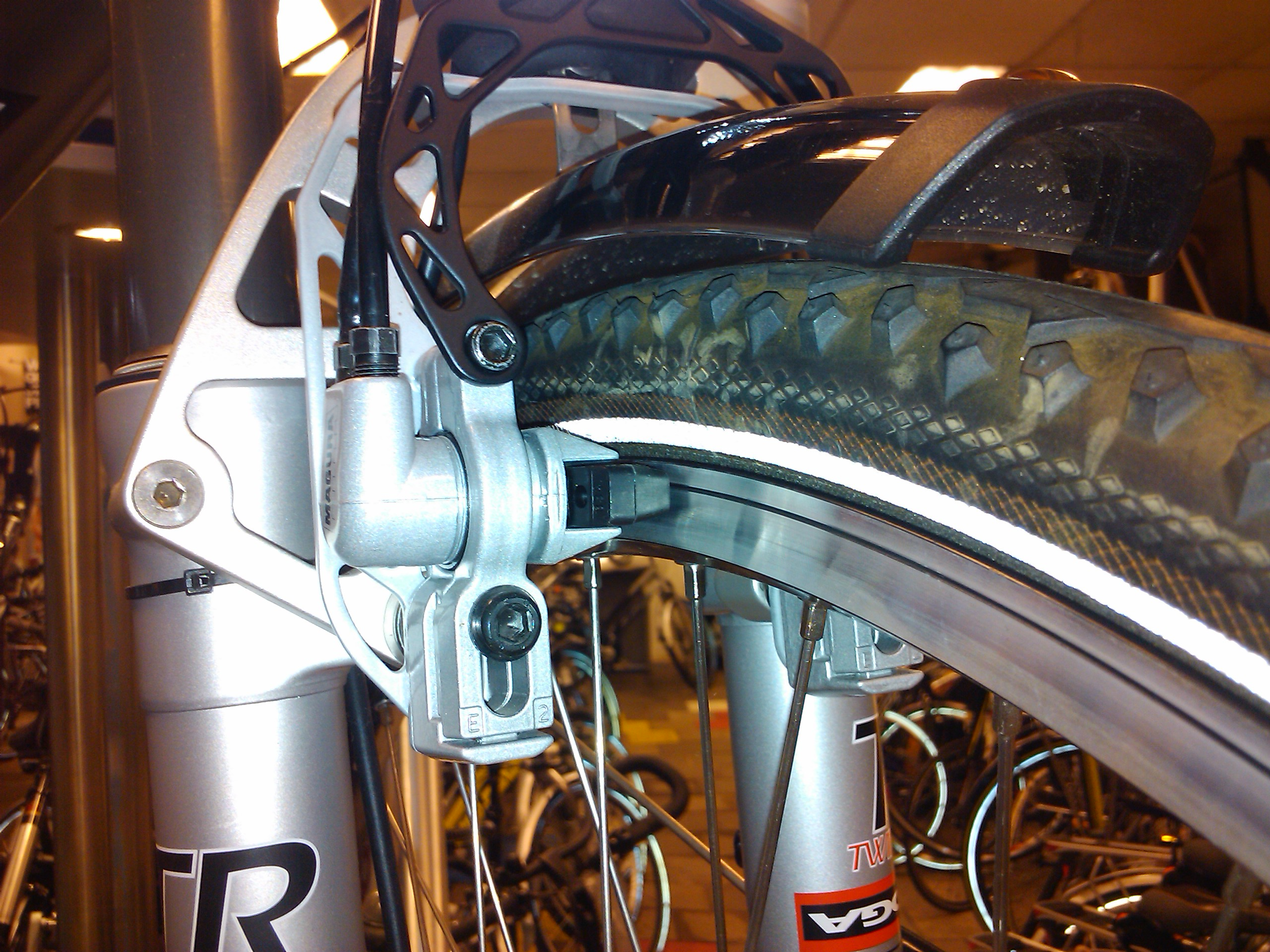
Magura hydraulic rim brake

Hydraulic rim brakes are one of the least common types of brakes. They are mounted either on the same pivot points used for cantilever and linear-pull brakes or they can be mounted on four-bolt brake mounts found on many trials frames. They were available on some high-end mountain bikes in the early 1990s, but declined in popularity with the rise of disc brakes. The moderate performance advantage (greater power and control) they offer over cable actuated rim brakes is offset by their greater weight and complexity. Some e-bikes continue to use them since they are powerful, relatively low-maintenance and weight is less of an issue when electric assistance is available.

=== Disc brakes ===
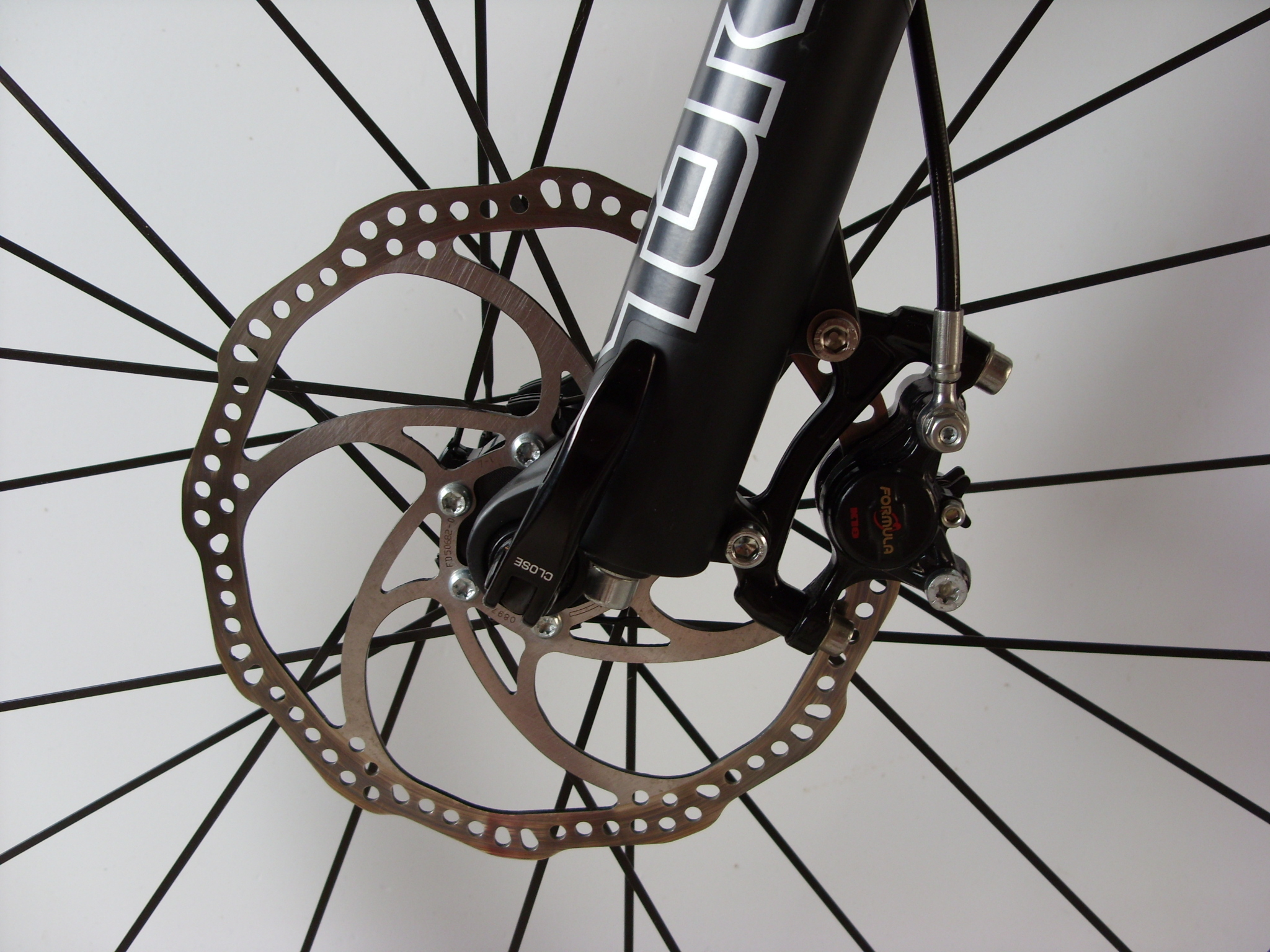
A hydraulic front disc brake. The disc is held by a six-bolt mount. The caliper is held attached to an IS fork mount via PM adapter.

A disc brake consists of a metal disc, or "rotor", attached to the wheel hub, which rotates with the wheel. Calipers are attached to the frame or fork along with pads that squeeze the rotors for braking. Disc brakes may be actuated mechanically by cable, or hydraulically.

Disc brakes are most common for mountain bikes (including nearly all downhill bikes), and are also seen on some hybrid bicycles and touring bicycles. Towards the end of the 2010s, disc brakes have become increasingly common also on racing bicycles. A disc brake is sometimes employed as a drag brake for controlled speed reduction on steep descents.

Many hydraulic disc brakes have a self-adjusting mechanism so as the brake pad wears, the pistons keep the distance from the pad to the disc consistent to maintain the same brake lever throw. Some hydraulic brakes, especially older ones, and most mechanical discs have manual controls to adjust the pad-to-rotor gap. Several adjustments are often required during the life of the pads.

==== Advantages ====
Disc brakes tend to perform equally well in all conditions including water, mud, and snow due to several factors:

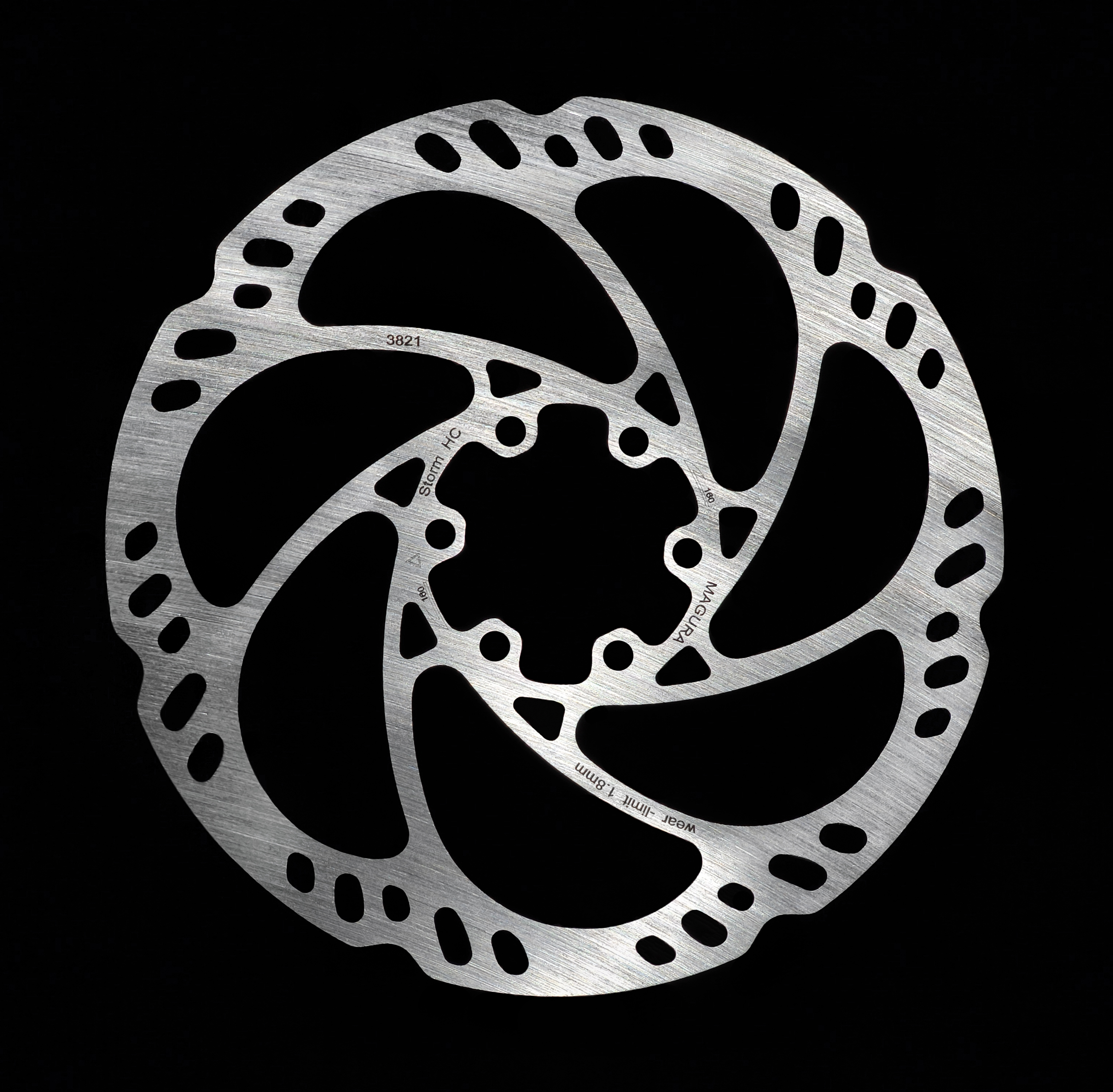
Rotor of Magura Julie disc brake with diameter 160 mm made of stainless steel

- The braking surface is farther from the ground and possible contaminants like mud which can coat or freeze on the rim and pads. With rim brakes, the first point that mud builds up on a mountain bike ridden in thick mud is usually the brakes. A mountain bicycle with disc brakes is less susceptible to mud buildup provided the rear frame and front fork yoke have sufficient clearance from the wheels.
- There are holes in the rotor, providing a path for water and debris to get out from under the pads.
- Wheel rims tend to be made of lightweight metal. Brake discs and pads are harder and can accept higher maximum loads.
- It is possible to ride a bicycle with a buckled wheel if it has disc brakes, where it would not be possible with a rim brake because the buckled wheel would bind on the brake pads.

Other reasons include:

- While all types of brakes will eventually wear out the braking surface, a brake disc is easier and cheaper to replace than a wheel rim or drum.
- The use of very wide tyres favors disc brakes, as rim brakes require ever-longer arms to clear the wider tyre. Longer arms tend to flex more, degrading braking. Disc brakes are unaffected by tyre width.
- Unlike some rarer rim brake designs, disc brakes are compatible with front and rear suspension.
- Different wheel sizes can be used with the same frame: i.e. the same frame built for 29″ tires can often also fit 27.5″+ (650+) tires, despite the two wheel sizes having different rim diameters. This is possible with disc brakes, so long as the rotor sizes are consistent and the frame has enough clearance; with rim brakes, this would be impossible, as the different rim sizes would not allow the same rim brakes to work with a different sized wheel. Wheel size optionality with disc brakes allows the rider more options, including using a smaller diameter rim-sized wheel (such as 27.5″+) with a higher volume wider tire with the same outer diameter size as a larger rim-sized wheel (such as 29″) – the outer diameter consistency is important as it preserves the geometry of the frame between the two different wheel sizes.

==== Disadvantages ====
- Disc brakes require a hub built to accept the disc, and a fork (for front brakes) or frame (for rear brakes) built to accept the caliper. Front hubs designed for discs often move the left hub's flange inward to make room for the disc, which causes the wheel to be dished. A dished wheel is laterally weaker when forced to the non-disc side. Other hubs use conventional flange spacing and provide a wheel without dish, but require a less common wide-spaced fork.
- A rim brake works directly on the rim and the attached tyre; a disc brake applies a potentially large torque moment at the hub. The latter has two main disadvantages:
  1. The torque moment must be transmitted to the tyre through the wheel components: flanges, spokes, nipples, and rim spoke bed. An engineered disc brake would reduce weight by not having most of the metal rim components.
  2. A front disc brake places a bending moment on the fork between the caliper anchor points and the tip of the dropout. In order to counter this moment and to support the anchor points and weight of the caliper, the fork must be of a certain size (most likely heavier).
  The heavier fork and wheels compound the weight disadvantage of the brake assembly itself.
- Heat build-up can lead to failure with disc brakes. Disc brakes heat discs in the same way as rim brakes heat rims, but discs provide an inherently smaller surface to dissipate heat. Excessive heat leads to boiling hydraulic fluid, resulting in brake fade or total failure. Overheating is more common in road cycling assuming the brakes are undersized to reduce weight. Recorded cases of disc brake failures usually involves several kilometers of downhill, combined with small underweight discs.
- The design and positioning of disc brakes can interfere with pannier racks not designed for them. For this reason, many manufacturers produce "disc" and "non-disc" versions.
- There have been some problems using disc brakes with certain frame designs. Under hard braking, the front wheel can come out from the dropouts. The problem has occurred when the brake pads and dropouts are aligned so the brake reaction force tends to eject the wheel from the dropout. Under repeated hard braking, the axle moves in the dropout in a way that unscrews the quick release. Riders should make sure the skewers are properly tightened before riding. Forks that use different brake/dropout orientations or through-axles are not subject to this problem.

==== Hydraulic vs. "mechanical" ====
There are two main types of disc brake: "mechanical" (cable-actuated) and hydraulic. Advantages and disadvantages are highly discussed by the users of each system. As advantages of cable-actuated disc brakes are argued lower cost, lower maintenance, and lighter system weight, hydraulic disc brakes are said to offer more braking power and better control. Cable-actuated disc brakes were traditionally the only type of disc brake that could be used with the brake levers found on drop handlebars, but this is no longer the case.

==== Single vs. dual actuation ====
Many disc brakes have their pads actuated from both sides of the caliper, while some have only one pad that moves. Dual actuation can move both pads relative to the caliper, or can move one pad relative to the caliper, then move the caliper and other pad relative to the rotor, called a "floating caliper" design. Single-actuation brakes use either a multi-part rotor that floats axially on the hub, or bend the rotor sideways as needed. Bending the rotor is theoretically inferior, but in practice gives good service, even under high-force braking with a hot disc, and may yield more progressiveness.

==== Multiple pistons ====
For disc brakes with a hydraulic system, high-performance calipers usually use two or three pistons per side; lower-cost and lower-performance calipers often have only one per side. Using more pistons allows a larger piston area and thus increased leverage with a given master cylinder. Also, pistons may be of several sizes so pad force can be controlled across the face of the pad, especially when the pad is long and narrow. A long narrow pad may be desired to increase pad area and thus reduce the frequency of pad changes. In contrast, a single large piston may be heavier.

==== Caliper mounting standards ====
There are many standards for mounting disc brake calipers. However, most manufactures today use either the IS or post-mount (PM) standards. These differ by disc size and axle type. In 2014 Shimano introduced a "Flat Mount" standard for high end road bikes and uses it exclusively for its top tier brake calipers.

==== Advantages and disadvantages of various types of mounts ====
A disadvantage of post mounts is that the bolt is threaded directly into the fork lowers. If the threads are stripped or if the bolt is stuck, then the threads will need to be repaired, or the seized bolt drilled out. Frame manufacturers have standardized the IS mount for the rear disc brake mount. In recent years post mount has gained ground and is becoming more common. This is mostly due to decreased manufacturing and part cost for the brake calipers when using post mount. A limitation of the mount is that the location of the rotor is more constrained: it is possible to encounter incompatible hub/fork combinations, where the rotor is out of range.

==== Disc mounting standards ====
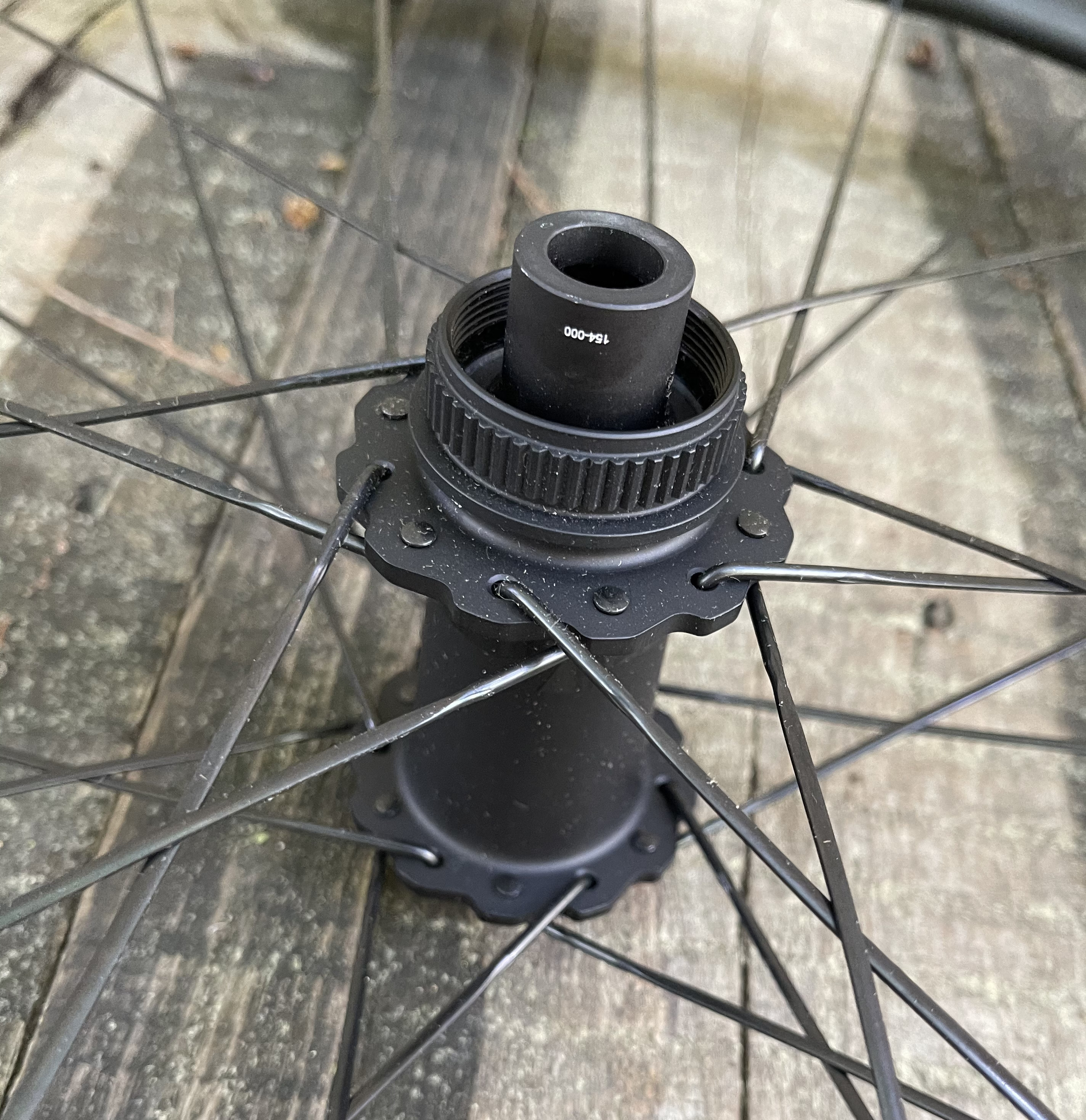
Center Lock hub: The disc mounts on the splines on the outside and is secured by a lockring engaging the internal thread.

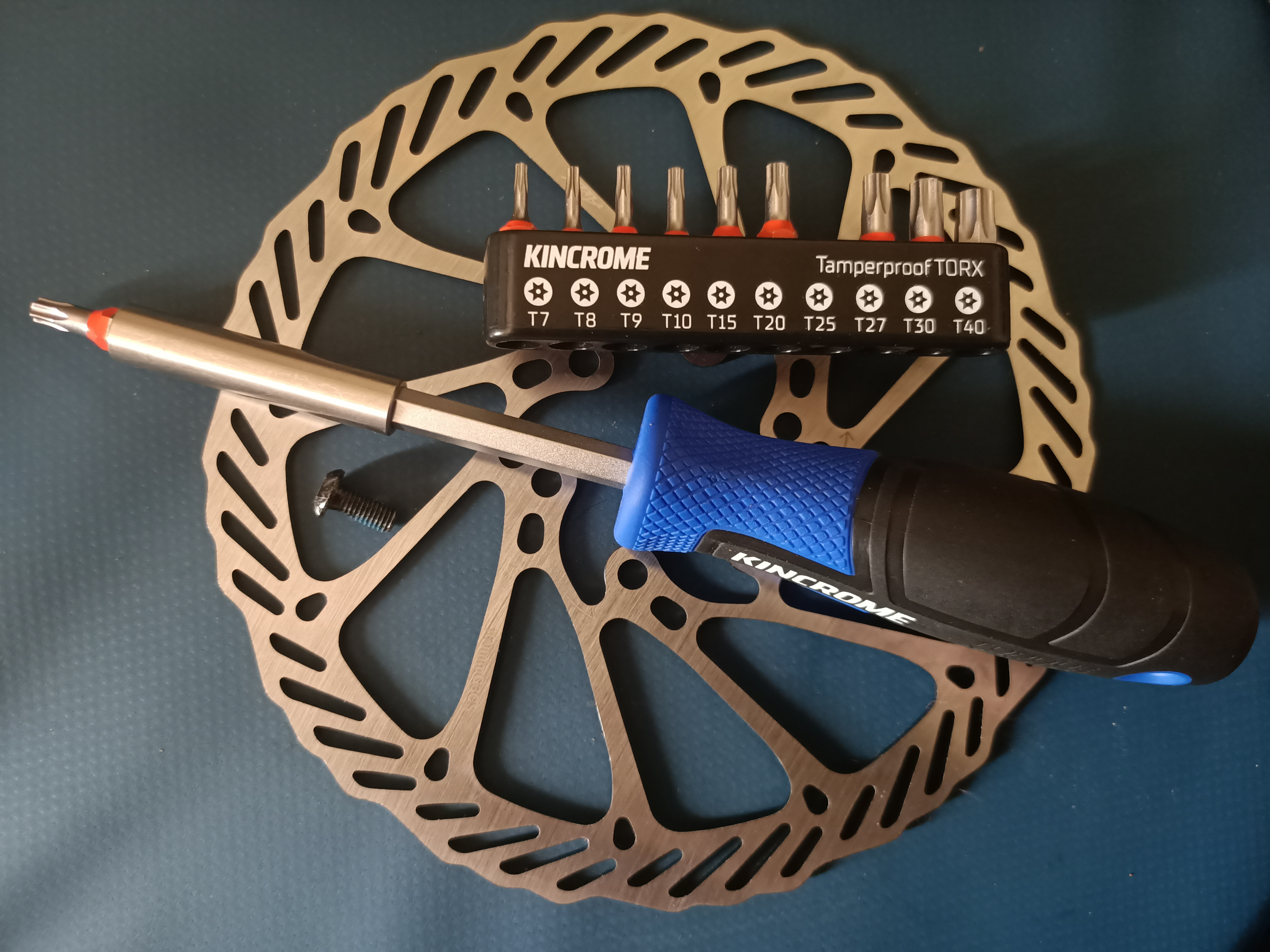
Torx screwdriver fitted with a T25 bit, a tool typically used to install or replace bicycle disc brakes.

There are many options for rotor mounting. Standard International Standard (IS) six‑bolt disc brake rotors are typically secured to hubs with M5×10 mm bolts that use a Torx T25 head. IS is a six-bolt mount and is the industry standard. Center Lock is patented by Shimano and uses a splined interface along with a lockring to secure the disc. The advantages of Center Lock are that the splined interface is theoretically stiffer, and removing the disc is quicker because it only requires one lockring to be removed. Some of the disadvantages are that the design is patented requiring a licensing fee from Shimano. A Shimano cassette lockring tool (or an external BB tool in case of through-axle hub) is needed to remove the rotor and is more expensive and less common than a Torx key. Advantages of IS six-bolt are that there are more choices when it comes to hubs and rotors.

Adaptors enable the use of six-bolt discs on Center Lock hubs.

Examples of mounting standards are shown here:

- International Standard (IS), 6-Bolt 44 mm bolt circle diameter (BCD)
- Center Lock (Shimano proprietary)
- Hope Technology's 3-bolt pattern (proprietary)
- Rohloff's 4-bolt pattern (proprietary)

==== Disc sizes ====
Rotors come in many different sizes, such as 160 mm (6.299 in) 185 mm (7.283 in) and 203 mm (7.992 in) diameter. Other sizes are available as manufacturers make discs specific to their calipers; the dimensions often vary by a few millimeters. Larger rotors provide greater braking torque for a given pad pressure, by virtue of a longer moment arm for the caliper to act on. Smaller rotors provide less braking torque but also less weight and better protection from knocks. Larger rotors dissipate heat more quickly and have a larger amount of mass to absorb heat, reducing brake fade or failure. Downhill bikes usually have larger brakes to handle greater braking loads. Cross country bicycles usually use smaller rotors which handle smaller loads but offer considerable weight savings. It is also common to use a larger diameter rotor on the front wheel and a smaller rotor on the rear wheel since the front wheel does the most braking (up to 90% of the total).

=== Drum brakes ===
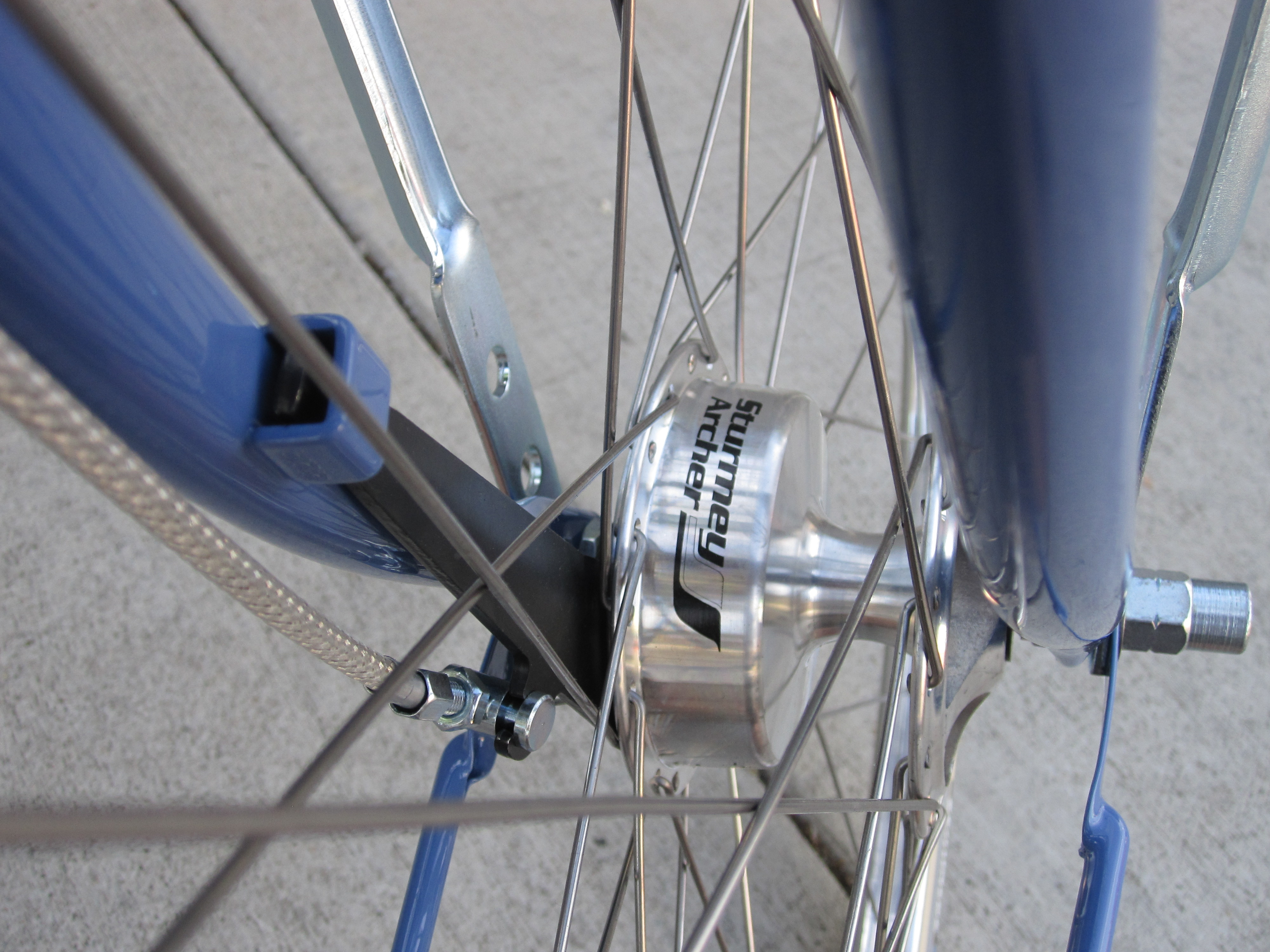
Sturmey-Archer front drum brake

Bicycle drum brakes operate like those of a car, although the bicycle variety use cable rather than hydraulic actuation. Two pads are pressed outward against the braking surface on the inside of the hub shell. Shell inside diameters on a bicycle drum brake are typically 70–120 mm (2.756–4.724 in). Drum brakes have been used on front hubs and hubs with both internal and external freewheels. Both cable- and rod-operated drum brake systems have been widely produced.

Drum brakes are most common on utility bicycles in some countries, especially the Netherlands, and are also often found on cargo bikes and velomobiles. Older tandem bicycles often employ a rear drum brake as a drag brake.

Drum brakes provide consistent braking in wet or dirty conditions since the mechanism is fully enclosed. They are usually heavier, more complicated, and often weaker than rim brakes, but they require less maintenance. Drum brakes do not adapt well to quick release axle fastening, and removing a drum brake wheel requires the operator to disconnect the brake cable as well as the axle. They also require a torque arm which must be anchored to the frame or fork of the bicycle, and not all bicycles are constructed to accommodate such fastenings or tolerate their applied forces.

=== Roller brakes ===
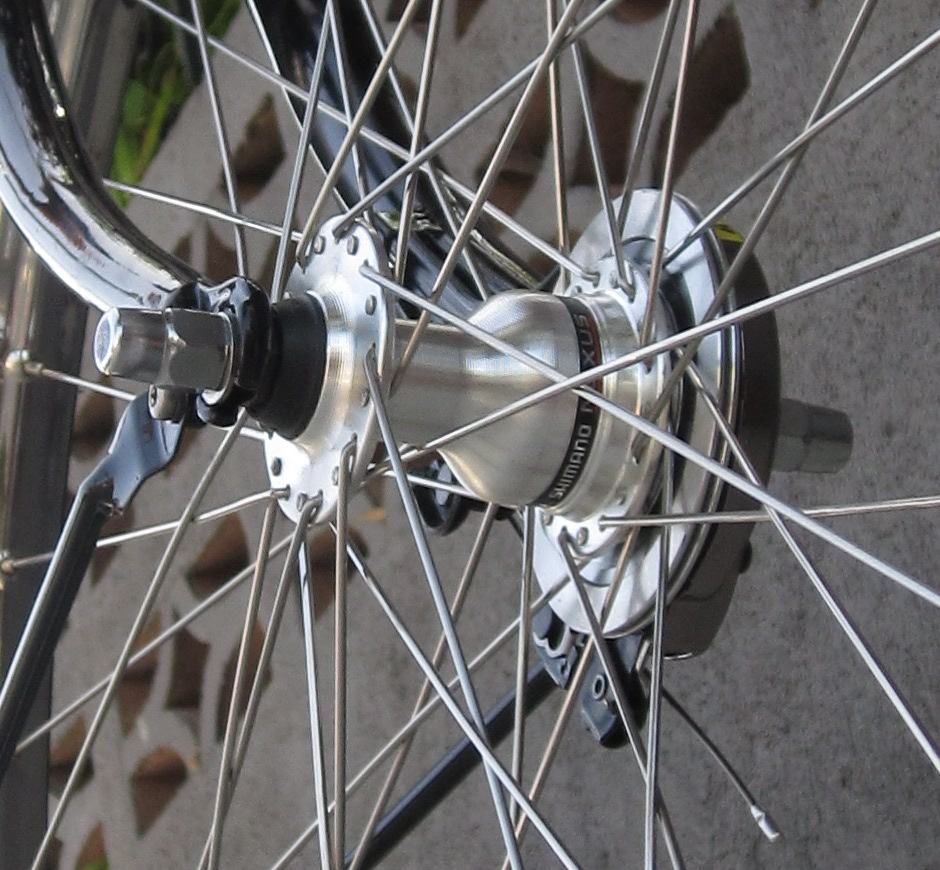
Shimano Roller Brake unit on a hub with the power modulator

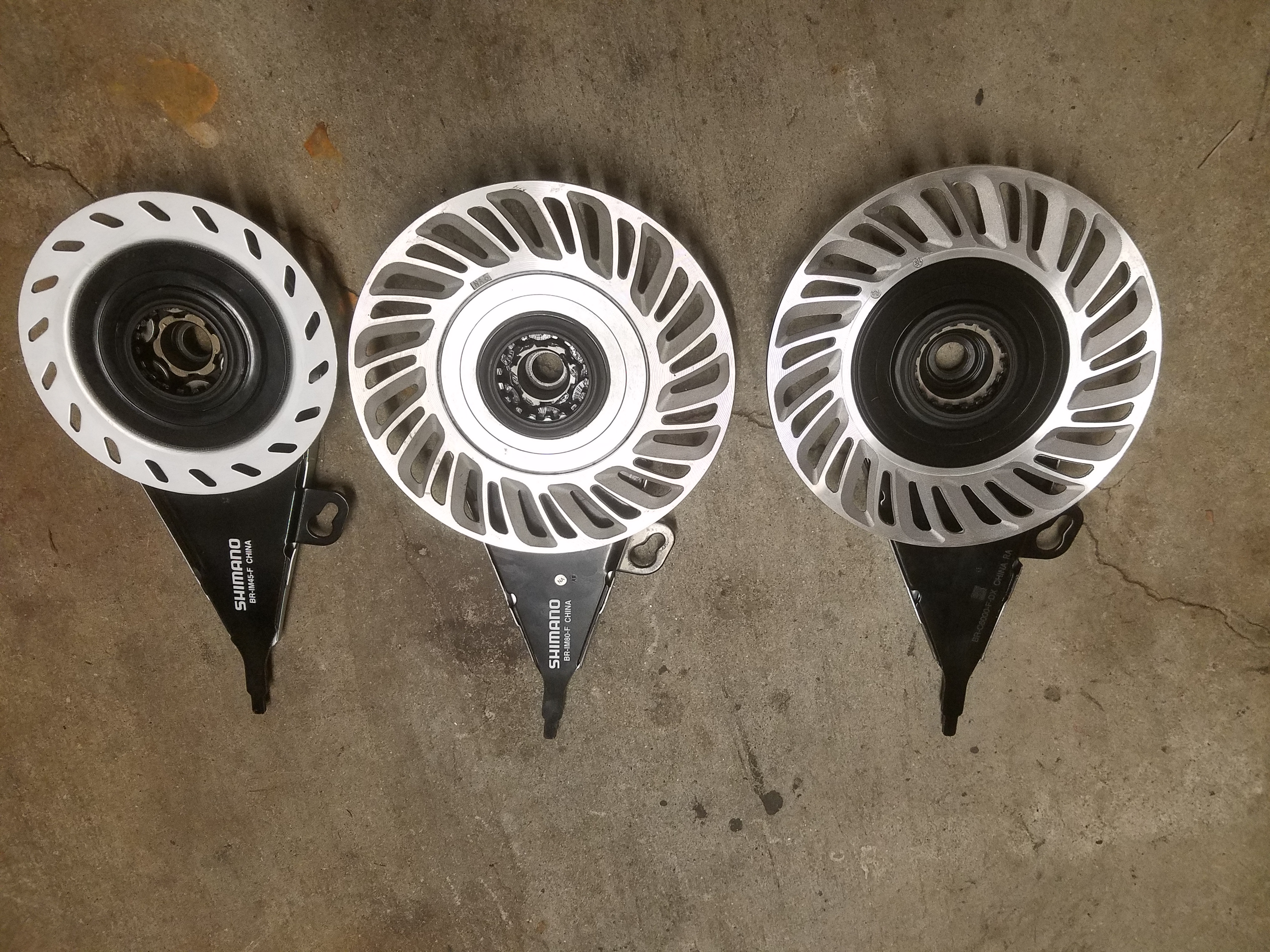
Three models of roller brake units differing in braking power

A roller brake is a specialised modular cable-operated drum brake, most widely manufactured by Shimano, designed to fit hubs with a proprietary splined interface. The brake mechanism is contained in an easily removable unit that mounts over the hub’s driver.

Actuation rotates an internal cam that pushes a set of rollers, which force brake shoes against the interior of the drum surface. The rollers transmit force but are not themselves friction surfaces. Many roller brake models use a finned heat sink to improve cooling, as the enclosed design can trap heat under prolonged braking.

Some models integrate a torque-limiting device, marketed as a “power modulator”, intended to reduce the likelihood of wheel lock-up. While this can improve control, it may also limit maximum braking force on bicycles with larger wheels.

Like other enclosed brakes, roller brakes offer dependable performance in adverse weather and low maintenance requirements, but they are relatively heavy and require frame or fork mounts for a torque arm. Compatibility is limited to hubs designed for the system, and regular lubrication is recommended to maintain smooth operation.

=== Coaster brakes ===
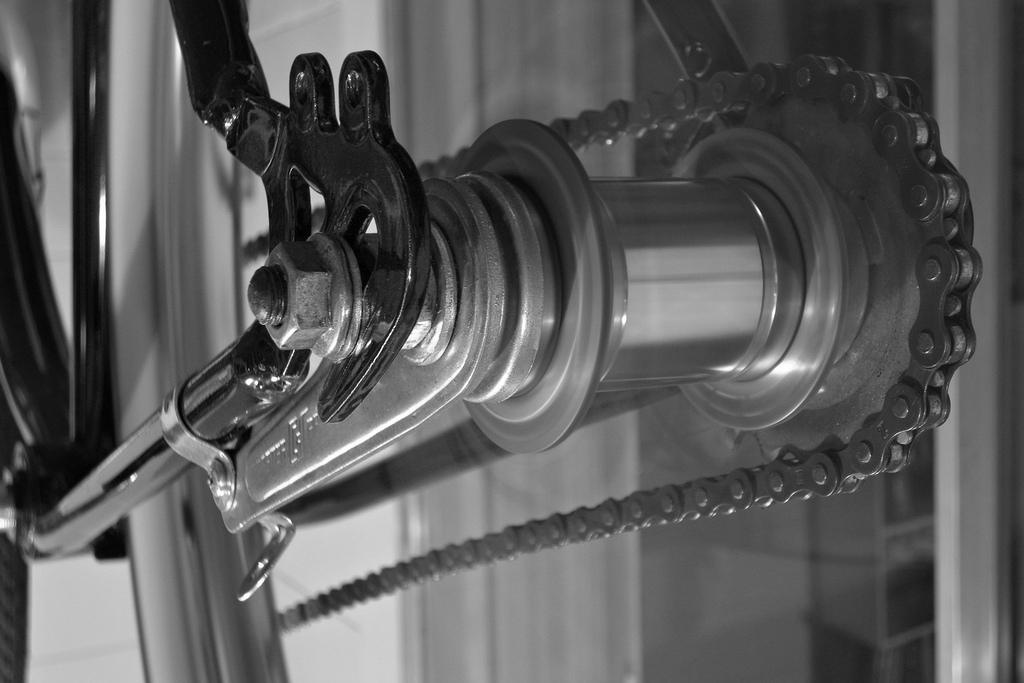
Single-speed coaster brake

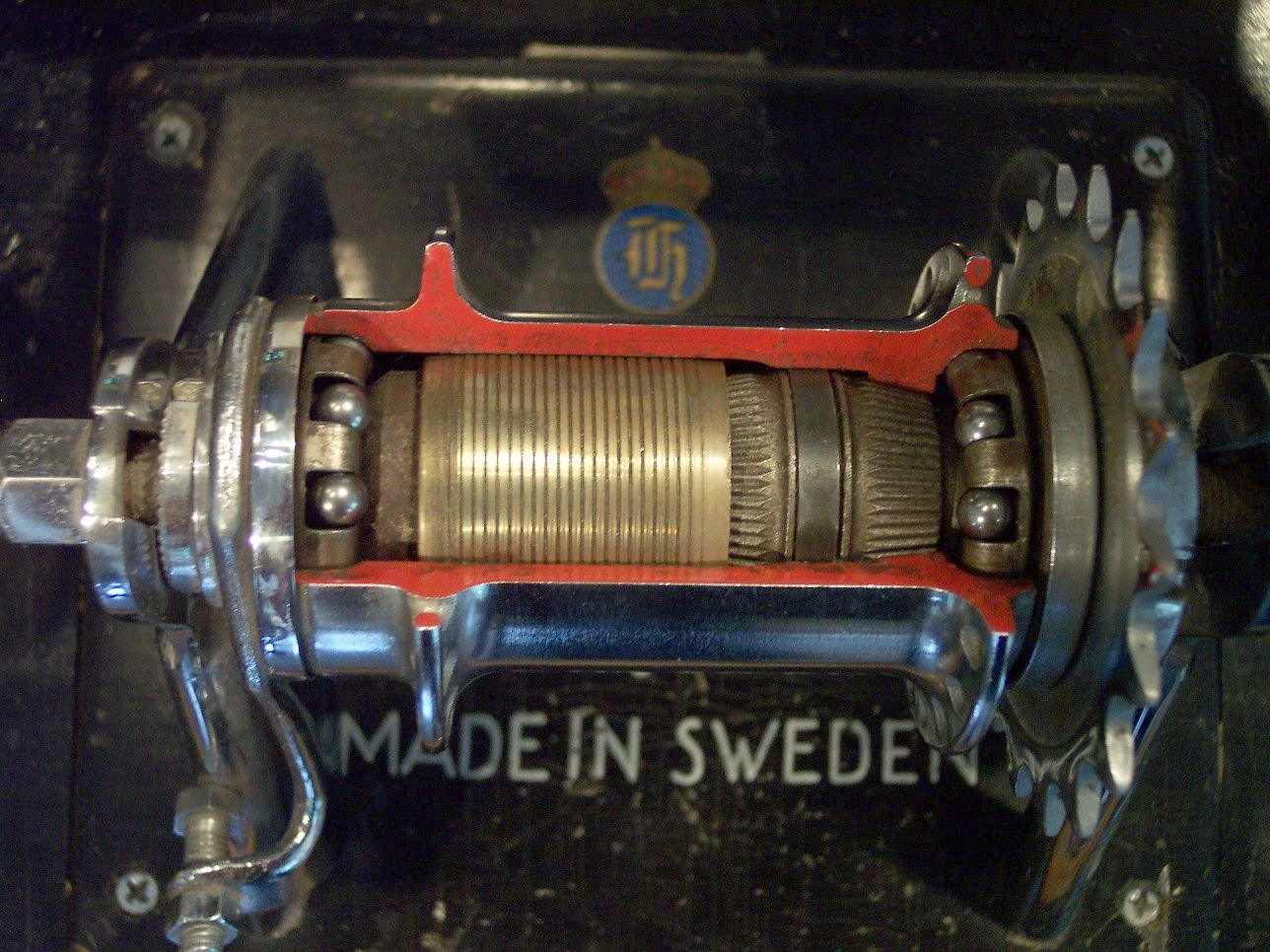
Cutaway view of a Husqvarna Novo coaster brake hub

Invented in 1898 by Willard M. Farrow, the "coaster brake", also known as a "back pedal brake" or "foot brake" ("torpedo" or "contra" in some countries, in Italy contropedale), is a type of drum brake integrated into the back hub with an internal freewheel. Freewheeling functions as with other systems, but when back pedaled, the brake engages after a fraction of a revolution. The coaster brake can be found in both single-speed and internally geared hubs.

When such a hub is pedaled forwards, the sprocket drives a screw which forces a clutch to move along the axle, driving the hub shell or gear assembly. When pedaling is reversed, the screw drives the clutch in the opposite direction, forcing it either between two brake shoes and pressing them against the brake mantle (which is a steel liner within the hub shell), or into a split collar and expanding it against the mantle. The braking surface is often steel, and the braking element brass or phosphor-bronze, as in the Birmingham-made Perry Coaster Hub. Crude coaster brakes also exist, usually on children's bicycles, where a serrated steel brake cone grips the inside of the hub shell directly, with no separate brake pads or mantle. These offer a less progressive action and are more likely to lock the rear wheel unintentionally.

Unlike most drum brakes (but like a Shimano Roller Brake) a coaster brake is designed to run with all its internal parts coated in grease for quiet operation and smooth engagement. Most grey molybdenum disulphide greases work well in a coaster brake, with its metal-to-metal friction surfaces.

Coaster-brake bicycles are generally equipped with a single cog and chain wheel and often use an 3.2-millimeter (1/8 in) wide chain. However, there have been several models of coaster brake hubs with derailleurs, such as the Sachs 2×3. These use special extra-short derailleurs which can stand up to the forces of being straightened out frequently and do not require an excessive amount of reverse pedal rotation before the brake engages. Coaster brakes have also been incorporated into hub gear designs – for example the AWC and SRC3 from Sturmey-Archer, and the Shimano Nexus 3-speed. They can have up to eight gears, like the Nexus inter-8.

Coaster brakes have the advantage of being protected from the elements and thus perform well in rain or snow. Though coaster brakes generally go years without needing maintenance, they are more complicated than rim brakes to repair if it becomes necessary, especially the more sophisticated type with expanding brake shoes. Coaster brakes also do not have sufficient heat dissipation for use on long descents, a characteristic made legendary through events such as the 'Repack Downhill' race, where riders almost certainly would need to repack their coaster brakes after the grease melted or smoked due to the heat from lengthy downhill runs. A coaster brake can only be applied when the cranks are reasonably level, limiting how quickly it can be applied. As coaster brakes are only made for rear wheels, they have the disadvantage common to all rear brakes of skidding the wheel easily. This disadvantage may, however, be alleviated if the bicycle also has a hand-lever-operated front brake and the cyclist uses it. Another disadvantage is that the coaster brake is completely dependent on the chain being fully intact and engaged. If the chain breaks or disengages from the chainwheel and/or rear sprocket, the coaster brake provides no braking power whatsoever. Like all hub brakes except disc brakes, a coaster brake requires a reaction arm to be connected to the frame. This may require unbolting when the wheel is removed or moved in its fork ends to adjust chain tension.

=== Drag brakes ===
A drag brake is a type of brake defined by its use rather than by its mechanical design.

A drag brake is intended to provide a constant decelerating force to slow a bicycle on a long downhill rather than to stop it; a separate braking system is used to stop the bicycle. A drag brake is often employed on a heavy bicycle such as a tandem in mountainous areas where extended use of rim brakes could cause a rim to become hot enough to blow out.; The typical drag brake has long been a drum brake. The largest manufacturer of this type of brake is Arai, whose brakes are screwed onto hubs with conventional freewheel threading on the left side of the rear hub and operated via Bowden cables. As of 2011, the Arai drum brake has been out of production for several years, with remaining stocks nearing depletion and used units commanding premium prices on internet auction sites.

More recently, large-rotor disc brakes are being used as drag brakes. (Some tandem riders with Avid BB-7 mechanical disc brakes and 203 mm rotors report fewer heat problems under heavy braking than when using the previous standard of comparison, an Arai drum used as a drag brake.) DT-Swiss make an adapter to mate disc rotors with hubs threaded for the Arai drum brake, but this still leaves the problem of fitting the caliper.

=== Band brake ===
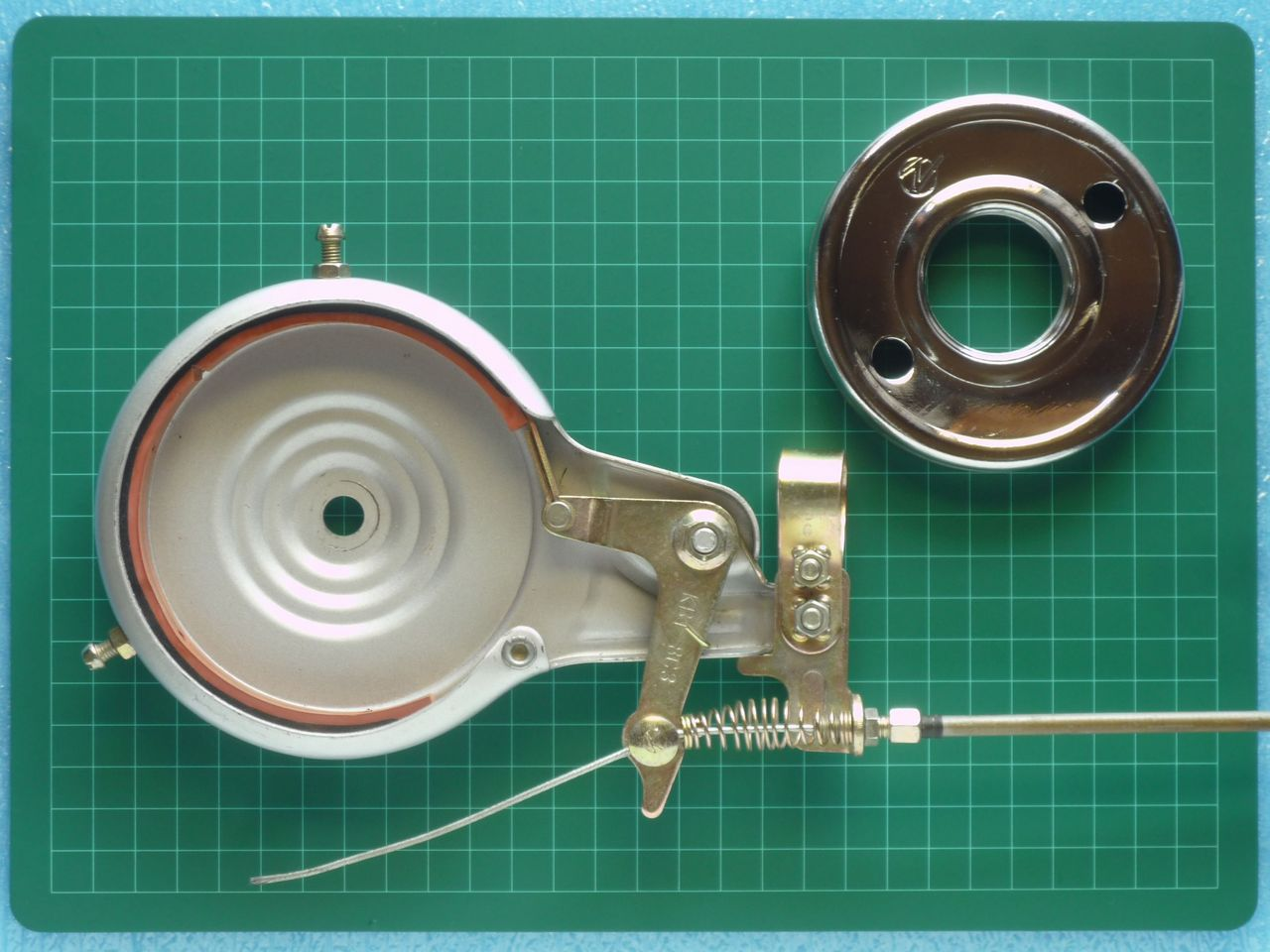
Band brake for rear wheel of a bicycle

A band brake consists of a band, strap, or cable that wraps around a drum that rotates with a wheel and is pulled tight to generate braking friction. Band brakes appeared as early as 1884 on tricycles. Star Cycles introduced a band brake in 1902 on its bicycles with freewheels.

A rim band brake, as implemented on the Yankee bicycle by Royce Husted in the 1990s, consists of a stainless-steel cable, wrapped in a kevlar sheath, that rides in a u-shaped channel on the side of the wheel rim. Squeezing the brake lever tightens the cable against the channel to produce braking friction. A return spring slackens the cable when the brake lever is released, no adjustment is required, and the brake becomes more forceful when wet. Husted said his inspiration was the band brake used on industrial machinery. The Yankee bicycle only included a rear brake, but that met U.S. Consumer Product Safety Commission standards.

== Actuation mechanisms ==
The actuation mechanism is that part of the brake system that transmits force from the rider to that part of the system that does the actual braking. Brake system actuation mechanisms are either mechanical or hydraulic.

=== Mechanical ===
The primary modern mechanical actuation mechanism uses brake levers coupled to Bowden cables to move brake arms, thus forcing pads against a braking surface. Cable mechanisms are usually less expensive, but may require some maintenance related to exposed areas of the cable. Other mechanical actuation mechanisms exist: see Coaster brakes for back-pedal actuation mechanisms, and rod-actuated brakes for a mechanism incorporating metal rods. The first Spoon brakes were actuated by a cable that was pulled by twisting the end of a handlebar.

=== Hydraulic ===
Hydraulic brakes also use brake levers to push fluid through a hose to move pistons in a caliper, thus forcing pads against a braking surface. While hydraulic rim brakes exist, today the hydraulic actuation mechanism is identified mostly with disc brakes. Two types of brake fluid are used today: mineral oil and DOT fluid. Mineral oil is generally inert, while DOT is corrosive to frame paint but has a higher boiling point. Using the wrong fluid can cause seals to swell or become corroded. A hydraulic mechanism is closed and therefore less likely have problems related to contamination at exposed areas. Hydraulic brakes rarely fail, but failure tends to be complete. Hydraulic systems require specialized equipment to repair.

==== Hydraulic brake fluid ====
Hydraulic disc brakes make use of two common forms of fluid: Automotive grade DOT 4 or DOT 5.1 which are hygroscopic and has a boiling point of 230 °C; and mineral oil which is not hygroscopic and has varying boiling points depending on the type. O-rings and seals inside the brake are specifically designed to work with one or the other fluid. Using the incorrect fluid type will cause the seals to fail resulting in a "squishy" feeling in the lever, and the caliper pistons are unable to retract, so a scraping disc is common. The brake fluid reservoir is usually marked to indicate the type of brake fluid to be used.

=== Hybrid ===
Some older designs, like the AMP and Mountain Cycles brakes, use a cable from lever to caliper, then use a master cylinder integrated into the piston. Some Santana tandem bicycles used a cable from lever to a master cylinder mounted near the head tube, with a hydraulic line to the rear wheel caliper. Such "hybrid" designs allow the leverage of a hydraulic system while allowing use of cable brake levers, but may be heavier and can suffer from grit intrusion in the standard cable.

An older Sachs drum brake kit ("Hydro Pull") allows to rebuild a regular Sachs bicycle drum brake to hydraulic lever and action. A piston is added outside the drum instead of the bowden clamp. This solution is often seen on modified Long John cargo bikes, allowing a low friction lever pull front wheel brake action. After Sachs ceased production of this kit a similar solution is sometimes done by welding on a Magura piston to the drum cylinder lever. Welding was necessary because the Magura action is reverse to that of the Sachs kit.

=== Brake levers ===
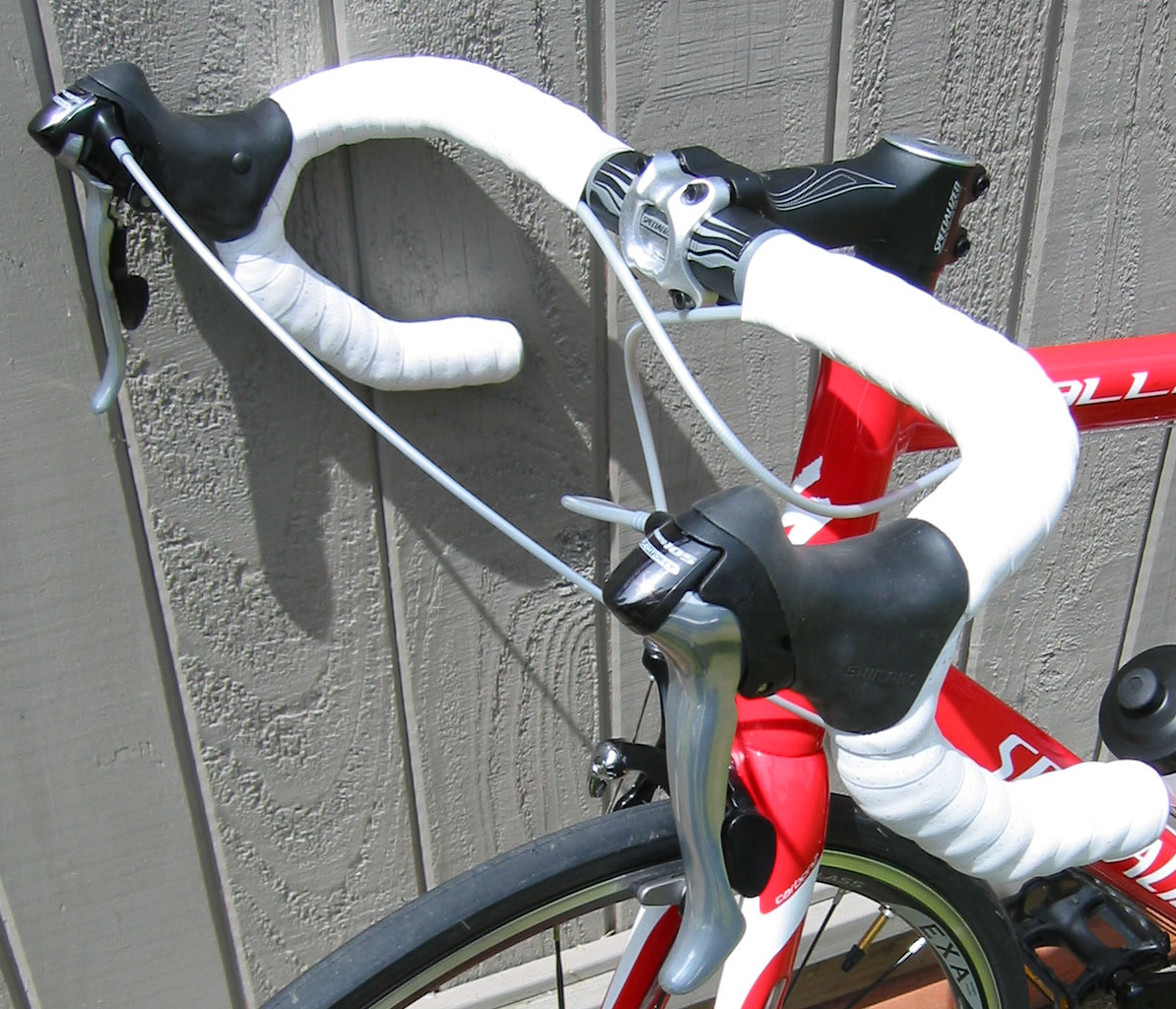
Brake levers on the drop handlebars of a road bike with integrated shifters

Brake levers are usually mounted on the handlebars within easy reach of the rider's hands. They may be distinct from or integrated into the shifting mechanism. The brake lever transmits the force applied by the rider through either a mechanical or hydraulic mechanism.

Bicycles with drop handlebars may have more than one brake lever for each brake to facilitate braking from multiple hand positions. Levers that allow the rider to work the brakes from the tops of the bars, introduced in the '70s, were called extension levers, safety levers or, due to their reputation for being unable to actuate the full range of travel of the brake, suicide levers. Modern top-mounted brake levers are considered safer, and are called interrupt brake levers due to their mechanism of action which "interrupts" the cable run from the primary lever and actuates the brake by pushing the cable housing downward instead of pulling the cable. This type of lever is also known as a "cross lever" due to its popularity in cyclo-cross.

The mechanical advantage of the brake lever must be matched to the brake it is connected to in order for the rider to have sufficient leverage and travel to actuate the brake. Using mismatched brakes and levers could result in too much mechanical advantage and hence not enough travel to properly actuate the brake (v-brakes with conventional levers) or too little mechanical advantage, requiring a very strong pull to apply the brakes hard (v-brake levers with other types of brake).

Mechanical (cable) brake levers come in two varieties based on the length of brake cable pulled for a given amount of lever movement:

- Standard pull levers work with most brake designs, including caliper brakes, traditional cantilever brakes, and mechanically actuated disc brakes branded for "Road".
- Long pull levers work with "direct-pull" cantilever brakes, such as Shimano "V-Brakes", and mechanically actuated disc brakes branded for "Mountain".

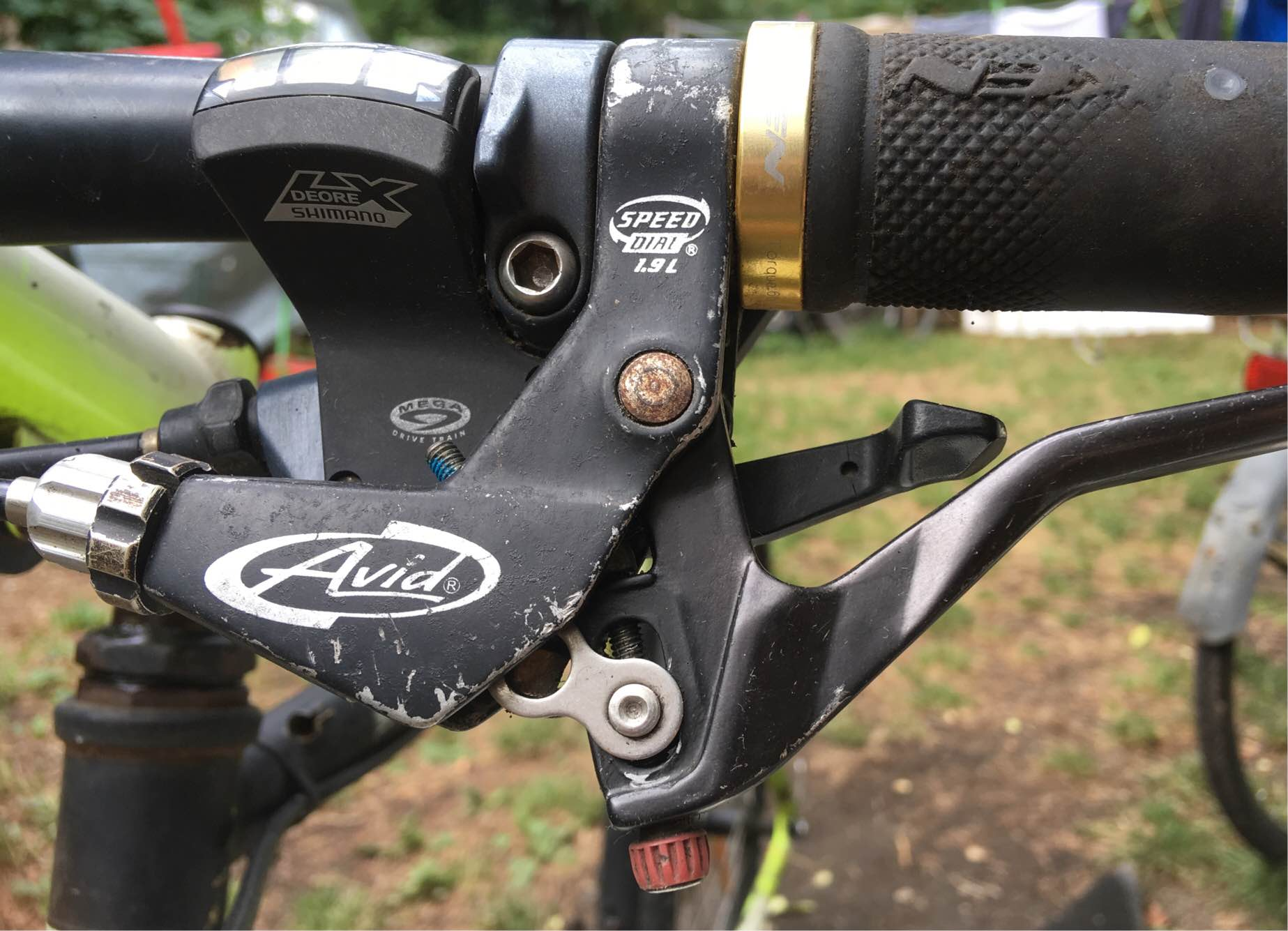
This lever's mechanical advantage (leverage) can be adjusted. For use with direct-pull cantilevers (V-Brakes) the attachment point of the cable is moved outward. For use with conventional cantilever brakes and caliper brakes it is moved inward.

Adapters are available to allow the use of one type of lever with an otherwise incompatible type of rim brake. Some brake levers have adjustable leverage that can be made to work with either type of brake. Others vary their mechanical advantage as the lever moves to move the pad quickly at first, then provide more leverage once it contacts the brake surface. Hydraulic brake levers move a piston in a fluid reservoir. The mechanical advantage of the lever depends on the brake system design.

== Braking technique ==
The motion dynamics of a bicycle will cause a transfer of weight to the front wheel during braking, improving the traction on the front wheel. If the front brake is used too hard, momentum may cause the rider and bike to pitch forward – a type of crash sometimes called an "endo". Light use of the rear brake causes a light skid as the bicycle approaches the limit where pitchover will occur, a signal to reduce force on the front brake. On a low-traction surface or when turning, the front wheel will skid, the bicycle cannot be balanced and will fall to the side instead.

On tandem bicycles and other long-wheel-base bicycles (including recumbents and other specialized bicycles), the lower relative centre of mass makes it virtually impossible for heavy front braking to flip the bicycle; the front wheel would skid first.

In some situations, it is advisable to slow down and to use the rear brake more and the front brake less:

- When unfamiliar with the braking characteristics of a bicycle. It is important to test the brakes and learn how much hand force is needed when first riding it.
- When leaning in a turn (or preferably, brake before turning).
- Slippery surfaces, such as wet pavement, mud, snow, ice, or loose stones/gravel. It is difficult to recover from a front-wheel skid on a slippery surface, especially when leaned over.
- Bumpy surfaces: If the front wheel comes off the ground during braking, its rotation will cease completely. Landing on a stopped front wheel with the brakes still applied is likely to cause the front wheel to skid and may flip the rider over the handlebar.
- Very loose surfaces (such as gravel and loose dirt): In some loose-surface situations, it may be beneficial to completely lock up the rear wheel in order to slow down or maintain control. On very steep slopes with loose surfaces where any braking will cause the wheel to skid, it can be better to maintain control of the bicycle by the rear brake more than one would normally. However neither wheel should stop rotating completely, as this will result in very little control.
- Steep descents: the slope angle makes the front flip more easily achieved, and moreover a front-wheel skid would be very difficult to recover (crash highly probable), whereas a rear skid does still drag the bike without losing too much control.
- Long descents: alternating the front and back brake can help prevent hand fatigue and overheating of the wheel rims which can cause a disastrous tyre blow-out, or boiling of the hydraulic fluid in case of hydraulic disc brakes.
- Flat front tyre: braking a tyre that has little air can cause the tyre to come off the rim, which is likely to cause a crash.

It is customary to place the front brake lever on the left in right-side-driving countries, and vice versa, because the hand on the side nearer the centre of the road is more commonly used for hand signals. Placing the front brake lever on the right also mimics the layout on motorcycles and is advantageous to avoid confusion when switching to and from a pedal cycle to motorcycle.

== Bicycles without brakes ==
Track bicycles are built without brakes so as to avoid sudden changes in speed when racing on a velodrome. Since track bikes have a fixed gear, braking can be accomplished by reversing the force on the pedals to slow down, or by locking the pedals backwards and inducing a skid. Fixed gear road bikes may also lack brakes, and slowing or stopping is accomplished as with a track bike. Many fixed gear bikes however are fitted with a front brake for safety reasons, or because it is a legal requirement. Some BMX bicycles are built without brakes to forgo the expense and complication of a detangler. The usual method of stopping is for the rider to put one or both feet on the ground, or to wedge a foot between the seat and the rear tyre, effectively acting as a spoon brake. Cycle speedway is a type of close track racing in the UK, Poland, Australia, and France. The special built bike has a single freewheel and no brakes. Slowing is done during cornering by dragging the inside foot. These bikes are not intended for road use and are kept at the track.

In the Netherlands, Belgium, Australia, Germany, the UK, France, Italy, Poland, Japan, Denmark, Sweden, and Finland, it is illegal to ride a bicycle without brakes on a public road. Moreover, Dutch law explicitly states that when rim brakes are used, both wheels must have them affixed. This prevents pitching forward over the front wheel when solely applying front-wheel brakes.

== Single-lever two-wheel brakes ==
The SureStop braking system uses a single lever to actuate the front brake using the friction applied to the back brake shoes by the rotation of the rear wheel from the rear brake. It is claimed this reduces the risk of some braking-related accidents including going over the handlebars.

This system emphasises the use of the rear brake, fails to optimise use of front braking, whilst being marketed as a solution to the fear of toppling over handle bars. The system encourages complacent use of brake levers by cyclists and reinforces the myth that the front brakes of bicycles are dangerous. Since this system means that the brakes on both wheels are directly tied together, the legality of such a system varies based on nation.

Cyclists young and old should seek training in the effective use of both brakes to stop in the minimum possible stopping distance in an emergency.

== See also ==
- Bicycle and motorcycle dynamics
- Detangler
- Glossary of cycling
- List of bicycle parts
