= Yankee Bicycle Company =

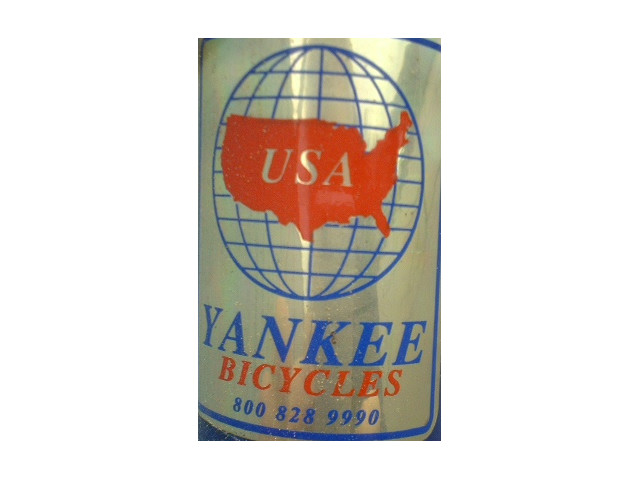
- Yankee Bicycle Headbadge
- Founded: 1991
- Founder: Royce Husted
- Headquarters: West Chicago, Illinois, United States
- Products: Bicycles

The Yankee Bicycle Company built bicycles in West Chicago, Illinois in 1991 and 1992. The bicycles were designed by Royce Husted incorporating his patented Rim Band Brake scheme as well as a Radial Gear concept for shifting through fifteen gears.

The Yankee Bicycle has neither rear or front derailleurs, internal hub, or chainring. Instead, the Radial Gear scheme uses a single six-segment sprocket that expands and contracts establishing different gear diameters. Unlike with derailleur systems, Radial Gearing will not cause inter-gear slippage.

In 1991, within Popular Sciences' Best of What's New issue, the Yankee Bicycle was awarded the Grand Award for Recreation.

The entry of the Yankee Bicycle into the bicycle market highlighted the impression that the bicycle industry is reluctant to introduce new innovative technology unless it is rolled out by major industry leaders (e.g., Schwinn Bicycle Company).

== History ==
Starting in 1991, the company was in operation for a year.

Being frustrated by bicycle manufacturers' reluctance to embrace new innovative bicycle technologies, Royce Husted, the founder, created his company and sold Yankee Bicycles out of a facility in West Chicago, Illinois. Husted would have preferred that others built and sold his bicycles.

Royce Husted witnessed his family having problems when they rode their bicycles. As a person capable of holding several patents, he designed a whole new approach to shifting and braking bicycles.

After being in operation for only one year, starting in 1991, the company and relevant patents were sold to NordicTrak in 1992.

== Yankee Bicycle ==
Perhaps only 3,000 Yankee Bicycles were built. The unique elements were not readily accepted by the bike industry which, arguably, valued only industry leaders' innovations. The name was derived as a reference to "Yankee ingenuity".

Unlike other regular recreational bikes, Yankee Bicycles use systems invented by the founder, Royce Husted, for its shifting and braking. Not using chainrings, Radial Gear has a single sprocket that expands and contracts in response to a single gear shift lever. The selection of the gear is based on the length of time the shift lever is depressed. The braking scheme uses a Kevlar-covered steel cable that completely encircles the rear wheel around an extra rim.

Due to lack of available parts and limited production, the Yankee Bicycles have become a collector's item (see external link section).
