= Bradford-on-Avon Tithe Barn =

Barn in Bradford-on-Avon, Wiltshire, England

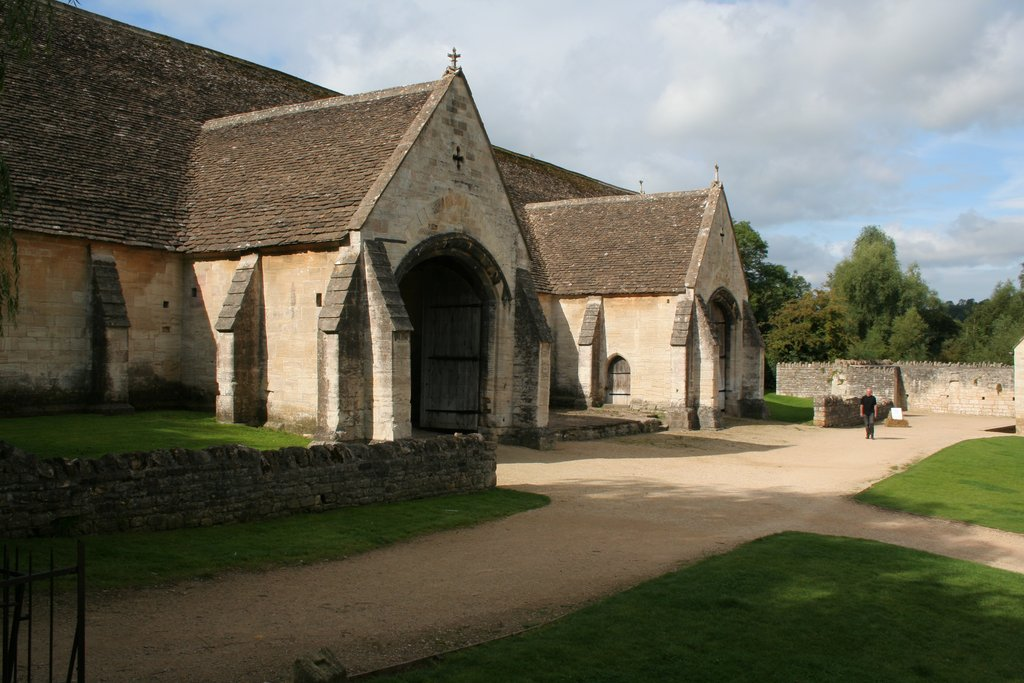

- Location within Wiltshire
- 51°20′34″N 2°15′19″W
- Location: Bradford-on-Avon
- OS grid reference: ST823604

History
- Built: between c. 1332 and 1367

Site notes
- Area: Wiltshire, England
- Owner: English Heritage

Listed Building – Grade I
- Official name: Tithe Barn at Barton Farm
- Designated: 18 April 1952
- Reference no.: 1184239

Bradford-on-Avon Tithe Barn is a Grade I listed barn in Pound Lane, Bradford on Avon, Wiltshire, England. It was part of a medieval grange belonging to Shaftesbury Abbey and was built in the early 14th century, with a granary dated to about 1400. It is owned and protected by English Heritage and managed by the Bradford on Avon Preservation Trust.

== Geography ==
The tithe barn is at Barton Farm on the southern side of Bradford-on Avon in West Wiltshire, to the south-east of Bath. The Kennet and Avon Canal passes close to the south side of the barn.

== History ==
The interior

The tithe barn and Barton Farm (left, background) seen from the Chapel of St Mary Tory (foreground)

An early barn, of which no remains survive today, was built on the site of the current barn around 1300. The current barn dates to the 1330s, probably c. 1332, and was certainly built before 1367. It originally belonged to the nuns of the nearby Shaftesbury Abbey in Dorset, the richest nunnery in England. It was used for storage of tithes during the Middle Ages. The abbey was entitled to 10% of the produce of its tenants.

When Shaftesbury Abbey was dissolved in 1539, the grange became a farm. By 1914 the building was superfluous to the farm's requirements and, rather than demolish it, the then owner, Sir Charles Hobhouse, donated the barn to the Wiltshire Archaeological Society. The farm continued in use until purchased by Wiltshire County Council in 1971, with the barn in use until 1974. The barn was designated as a scheduled monument in 1930 and as a Grade I listed building in 1952.

By the 1980s, the weight of the roof was pushing the walls out, necessitating the underpinning of the walls and the installation of iron cross-ties to stop the movement.

== Features ==
A large building, 51 m (167 ft) long by 9 m (30 ft) wide, the barn forms part of a range of farm buildings grouped around an open rectangular yard. There are two large porches on the northern side to allow entry for loaded carts. Opposite them are smaller porches to allow the empty carts to leave. The apertures high above the doors, which still contain some original wood, are left unglazed to allow owls to enter in search of vermin.

An attraction for visitors is the barn's interior, with its timber cruck roof spanning 14 bays divided by A-shaped trusses supporting 100 tons of stone tiles.

== Popular culture ==
In the 1980s, the barn was a filming location for the cult TV series Robin of Sherwood, doubling as Nottingham Castle's great hall.
