= Bradford on Avon =

Town in Wiltshire, England

Coordinates: 51.347°N 2.251°W

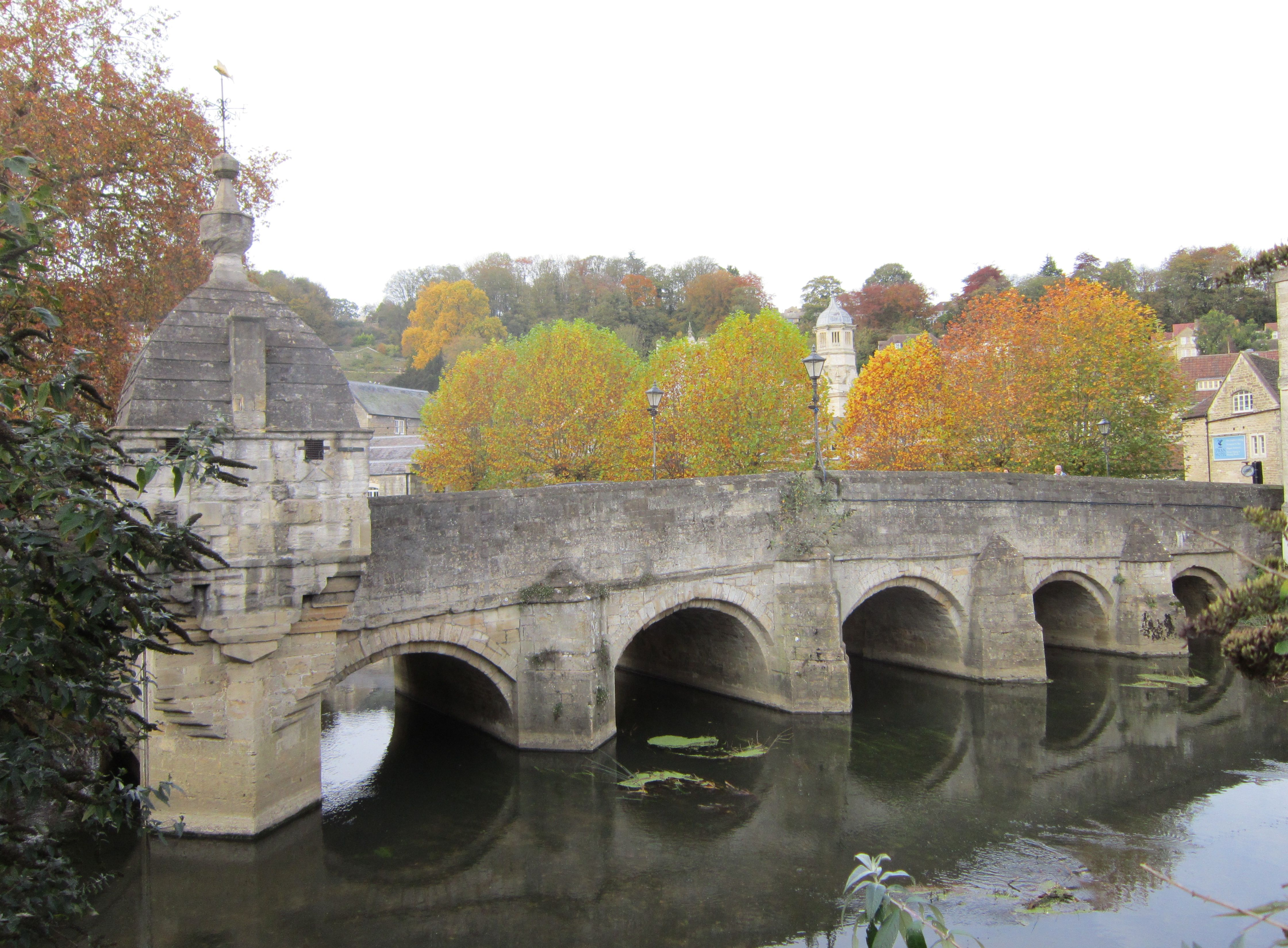
- Town Bridge over the river Avon, showing the lockup (small domed building)

- Location within Wiltshire
- Population: 10,405 (2021 census)
- OS grid reference: ST826609
- Civil parish: Bradford-on-Avon
- Unitary authority: Wiltshire
- Ceremonial county: Wiltshire
- Region: South West
- Country: England
- Sovereign state: United Kingdom
- Post town: Bradford-on-Avon
- Postcode district: BA15
- Dialling code: 01225
- Police: Wiltshire
- Fire: Dorset and Wiltshire
- Ambulance: South Western
- UK Parliament: Melksham and Devizes
- Website: Town Council

Bradford on Avon (sometimes Bradford-on-Avon) is a town and civil parish in west Wiltshire, England, near the border with Somerset. The town's canal, historic buildings, shops, pubs and restaurants make it popular with tourists. The parish had a population of 10,405 at the 2021 census.

The history of the town can be traced back to Roman origins. It has several buildings dating from the 17th century, when the town grew due to the thriving English woollen textile industry.

== Toponymy ==
The centre of the town grew up around the ford across the river Avon, hence the town's name ("Broad-Ford"). The ford continued in use until the 19th century.

It is argued that the hyphenated form of Bradford-on-Avon is incorrect and was introduced by the Great Western Railway in 1899 on signs at Bradford-on-Avon railway station, although the station opened in 1857. The dispute as to whether the name is hyphenated or not has been called "the great dash debate", and in August 2026 the BBC reported on what it termed "Town's mission to correct century-long spelling error".

As of August 2026, both the hyphenated and unhyphenated forms of the name were in use. The town council and Wiltshire Council used the unhyphenated form, as did the local MP. On or before 8 September 2026 Google mapping changed from the hyphenated form to the unhyphenated form. Ordnance Survey mapping used the hyphenated form for the names of both the town and the civil parish on its 1:25,000 and 1:50,000 maps. The name of the civil parish as set out in The Local Government (Successor Parishes) Order in 1973 is hyphenated. The Royal Mail used the hyphenated form in local addresses.

On 31 August 2026, Britannica.com's article on the town was changed to the title "Bradford on Avon": it had earlier been at the hyphenated title.

== History ==
The earliest evidence of habitation is fragments of Roman settlements above the town. In particular, archaeological digs have revealed the remains of a large Roman villa with a well-preserved mosaic, now within the playing fields of St Laurence School. The ford which gave the town its name was supplemented in Norman times by the stone bridge that still stands today. The Norman side is upstream, and has pointed arches; the newer side has curved arches. The Town Bridge and Chapel is a Grade I listed building. It was originally a packhorse bridge, but widened in the 17th century by rebuilding the western side. On 2 July 1643 the town was the site of a skirmish in the English Civil War, when Royalists seized control of the bridge on their way to the Battle of Lansdowne.

On the bridge stands a small building which was originally a chapel but was later used as a town lock-up. The weathervane on top takes the form of a gudgeon (an early Christian symbol), hence the local saying "under the fish and over the water". The gilded fish is a perch; Bradford gudgeon is a local term.

The river provided power for the wool mills that gave the town its wealth. The town has 17th-century buildings dating from the most successful period of the local textile industry. The best examples of weavers' cottages are on Newtown, Middle Rank and Tory Terraces. Daniel Defoe visited Bradford on Avon in the early 18th century and commented: "They told me at Bradford that it was no extra-ordinary thing to have clothiers in that country worth, from ten thousand, to forty thousand pounds a man [equivalent to £1.3M to £5.3M in 2007], and many of the great families, who now pass for gentry in those counties, have been originally raised from, and built up by this truly noble manufacture."

With improving mechanisation in textile manufacture during the Industrial Revolution, the wool weaving industry moved from cottages to purpose-built woollen mills adjacent to the river, where they used water and steam to power the looms. Around thirty such mills were built in Bradford on Avon alone, and these prospered further until the English woollen industry shifted its centre of power to Yorkshire in the late 19th century. The last local mill closed in 1905. Many have since stood empty and some became derelict.

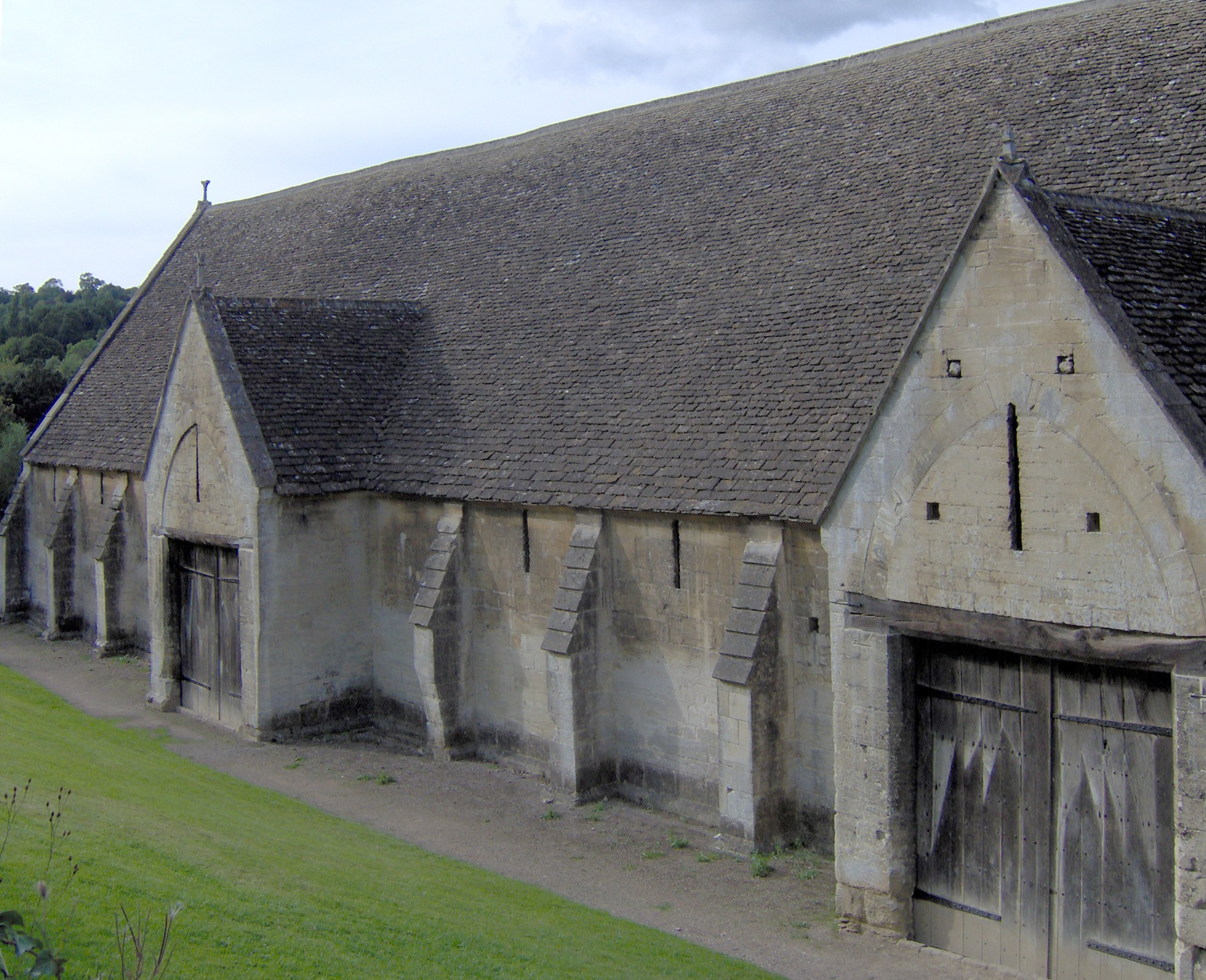
Barton Farm Tithe Barn

A notable feature of Bradford on Avon is the large Grade I listed tithe barn, 180 feet long and 30 feet wide, which was constructed in the 14th century and is now part of Barton Farm Country Park. The barn was used for collecting taxes, in the form of goods, to fund the church.

There are several notable buildings in and around the town centre. Many of the old textile factories have been converted into modern flats and apartments; the Kingston Mills site obtaining planning permission in 2007. Few of the buildings are still used today in their original roles. One of the few is The Swan, a public house and hotel set in the centre of town; the building is 17th century and retains many original features, in particular the stone flag floors. Records show that there has been a public house on the same site since the 1500s. The Hall, on the eastern edge of the town, is a Jacobean mansion built for John Hall, a wealthy mill-owner, in about 1610. It was bought by Stephen Moulton in 1848, and is now managed by the Alex Moulton Charitable Trust.

In 1998 the Wiltshire Music Centre was opened in Bradford on Avon, on the grounds of St Laurence School. In 2000, the millennium sculpture nicknamed "Millie" was unveiled.

In 2003, Bradford on Avon was granted Fairtrade Town status.

== Geography ==
The Avon Valley and Barton Farm seen from St Mary Tory in Bradford

The town lies partly in the Avon Valley, and partly on the hill that marks the Vale's western edge, 8 miles (13 km) southeast of Bath, in the hilly area between the Mendip Hills, Salisbury Plain and the Cotswold Hills. The local area around Bath provides the Jurassic limestone known as Bath stone, from which the older buildings are constructed. The River Avon (the Bristol Avon) runs through the town. The larger town of Trowbridge is nearby to the southeast.

The town includes the suburbs of Bearfield and Woolley; the parish includes the hamlets of Widbrook and Woolley Green.

=== Green belt ===
Avon Green Belt map Green belt County borders District/Unitary authority borders

Wiltshire features a green belt along a small portion of its western fringe as part of the extensive Avon Green Belt, which extends beyond Wiltshire into surrounding areas. It completely surrounds Bradford on Avon. It helps to maintain the setting and preserve the character of the town by maintaining separation from nearby settlements such as Trowbridge, Winsley, and Westwood. However, this vital green belt is experiencing significant development pressure. In May 2026, developer Waddeton Park Ltd submitted a controversial proposal to develop a 75-acre agricultural site known as Beehive Field, located off Trowbridge Road between Bradford on Avon and Trowbridge.

Physically bounded by the River Avon and the Kennet and Avon Canal, the application outlines plans for 224 homes and a 12-hectare country park. The project faces strong opposition from local residents and was unanimously rejected by the Bradford on Avon Town Council in July 2026 due to severe concerns over traffic congestion, infrastructure strain, and the permanent loss of green belt land.

This speculative development was facilitated by the Labour government's late-2024 revisions to the National Planning Policy Framework (NPPF), which established the 'grey belt' designation. This new classification targets previously developed or lower-quality green-belt land that are subjectively viewed as failing to strongly contribute to core green-belt purposes, such as preventing towns from merging or checking urban sprawl. Because Wiltshire Council lacks an up-to-date local plan and a sufficient statutory housing land supply, developers can argue that contested parcels of land qualify for targeted release as grey belt, bypassing traditional protections and leaving these buffer zones vulnerable to encroachment.

== Religious sites ==
=== Early church ===
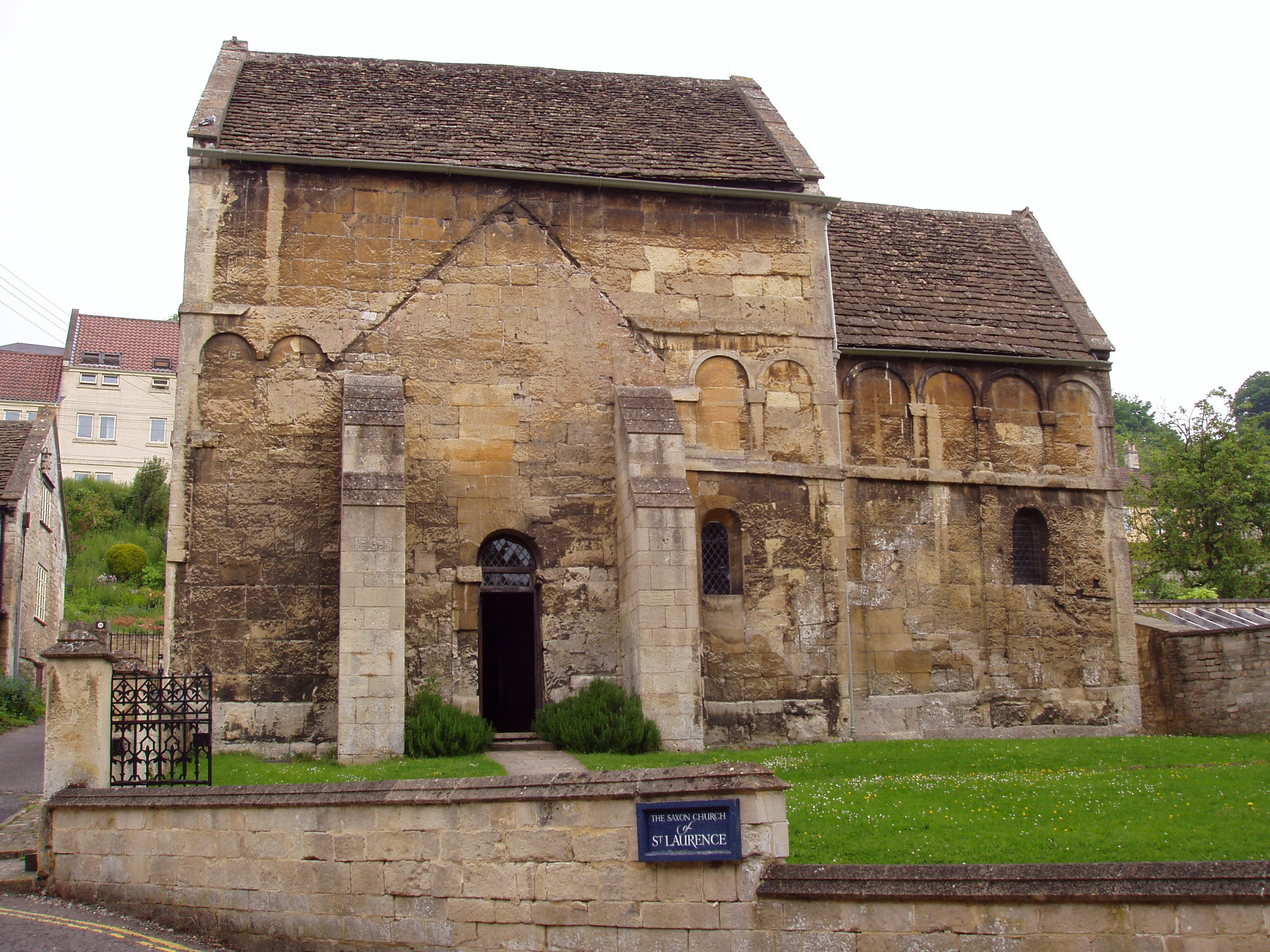
St Laurence's Church

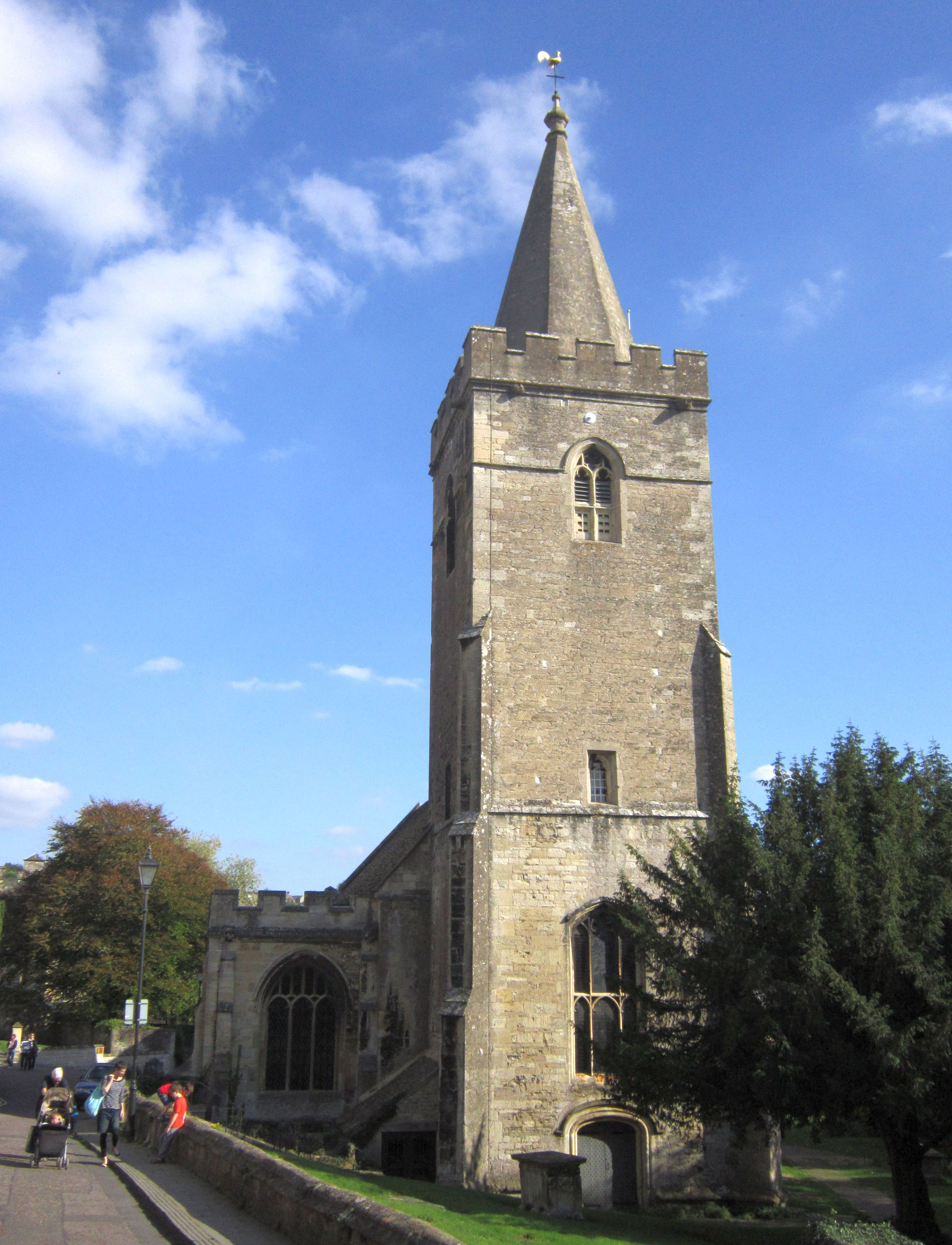
Holy Trinity Church, Bradford-on-Avon

The Saxon church dedicated to Saint Laurence may have been founded by Saint Aldhelm around 705, and could have been a temporary burial site for King Edward the Martyr. It was rediscovered by the Anglican priest, antiquarian and author William Jones in 1856, having been used for secular purposes (apparently becoming a house, a school and part of a factory).

It is suggested that some of the building, containing the blind arcades at a higher level, may belong to a later period while a leaflet available at the church in February 2012 seems to prefer the period 950–1050 for the whole building. The elaborate ornamentation of the exterior consists of pilaster-strips, a broad frieze of two plain string-courses between which is a blind arcade of round-headed arches whose short vertical pilasters have trapezoidal capitals and bases, while on the eastern gable and the corners adjacent there is a series of mouldings as vertical triple semicylinders.

Inside the church, high in the wall above a small chancel arch, are the carved figures of two flying angels, the right-hand figure reportedly "intended to be clothed in transparent drapery ... the legs from the knee downward are depicted as showing through the transparent robe" which is referred to as a "quaint fancy".

=== Others ===
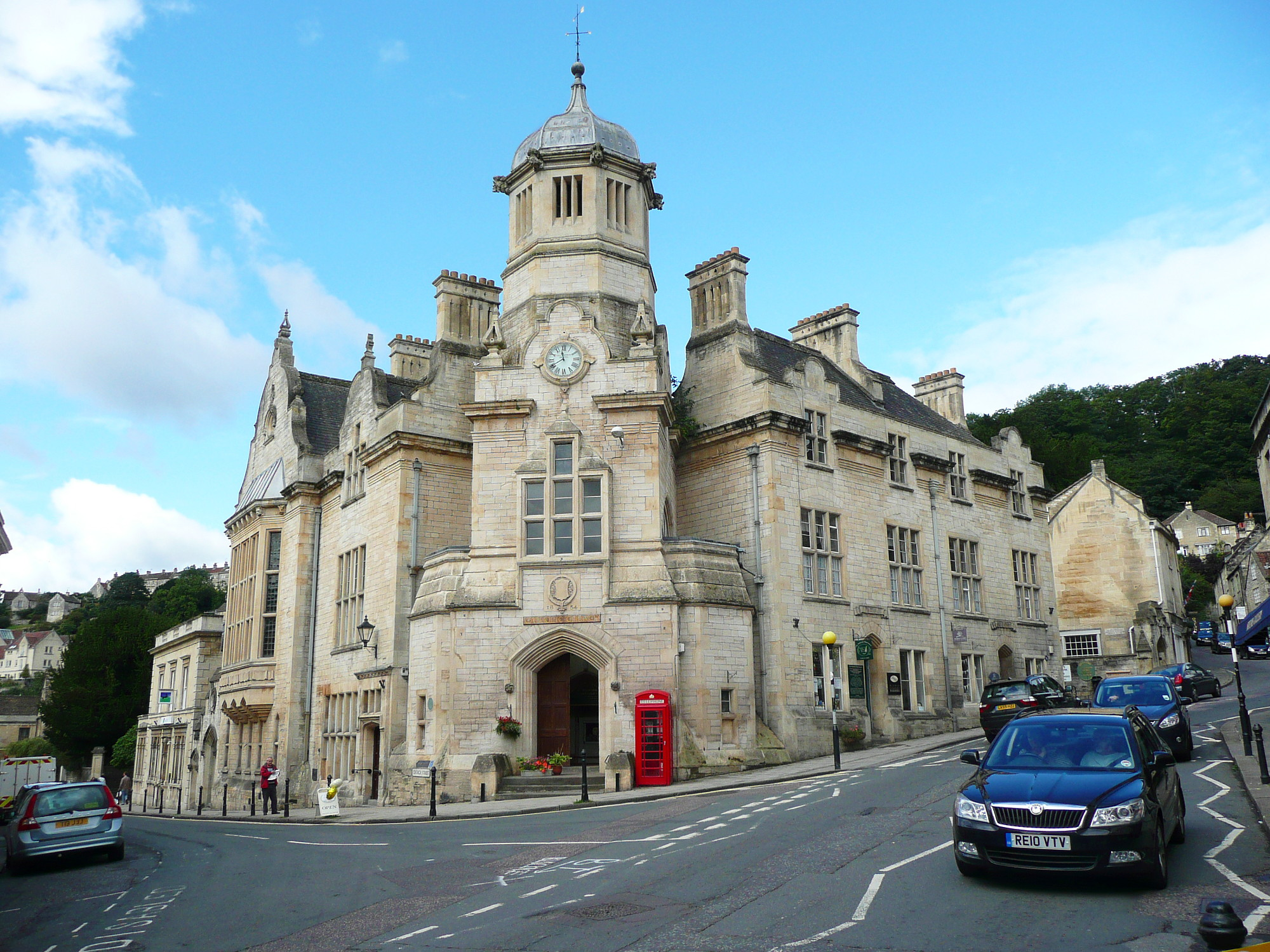
The former town hall which is now the local Catholic church

In addition to the Saxon church, the town has two Church of England churches, a late-medieval chapel, two Baptist chapels, a United Church (Methodist and United Reformed Church), a free nonconformist church, a community church, a Quaker (Society of Friends) meeting house, and a Roman Catholic church.

Holy Trinity Church is the original parish church, and stands near the town centre by the river. The grade I listed building is Norman in origin, and it is possible that the chancel was built over the remains of an older church. Several chapels were added on the north side, and the wall in between was later opened up so that the chapels now form the north aisle. A squint, or hagioscope, near the altar is claimed to be England's longest. The tower and spire was built around 1480, replacing an older one, and the south wall was largely rebuilt in the 19th century. The church has a ring of eight bells, with the tenor (heaviest bell) weighing 29 long cwt 2 qr 26 lb (3,330 lb or 1,510 kg).

The other Anglican church, Christ Church, is entirely a Victorian construction. The Catholic church, dedicated to St. Thomas More, occupies a grade II listed building, dating from 1854, that used to be the town hall.

A chapel known as St Mary Tory can be found near the top of the terraced hillside above the town. It dates to the 15th or 16th century, possibly serving as a stop for medieval pilgrims travelling between Glastonbury and Malmesbury Abbey. It was restored in the 19th century.

There is also a Buddhist monastery in the town, under the auspices of the Aukana Trust; it comprises a monastic building each for men and for women, and a meditation hall. There are also workshops, gardens and a library, and the elegant buildings look down upon the town from a hill. The monastery practises the Theravadin tradition of Buddhism, and offers opportunities for both full-time residential and part-time practise and study.

== Economy ==
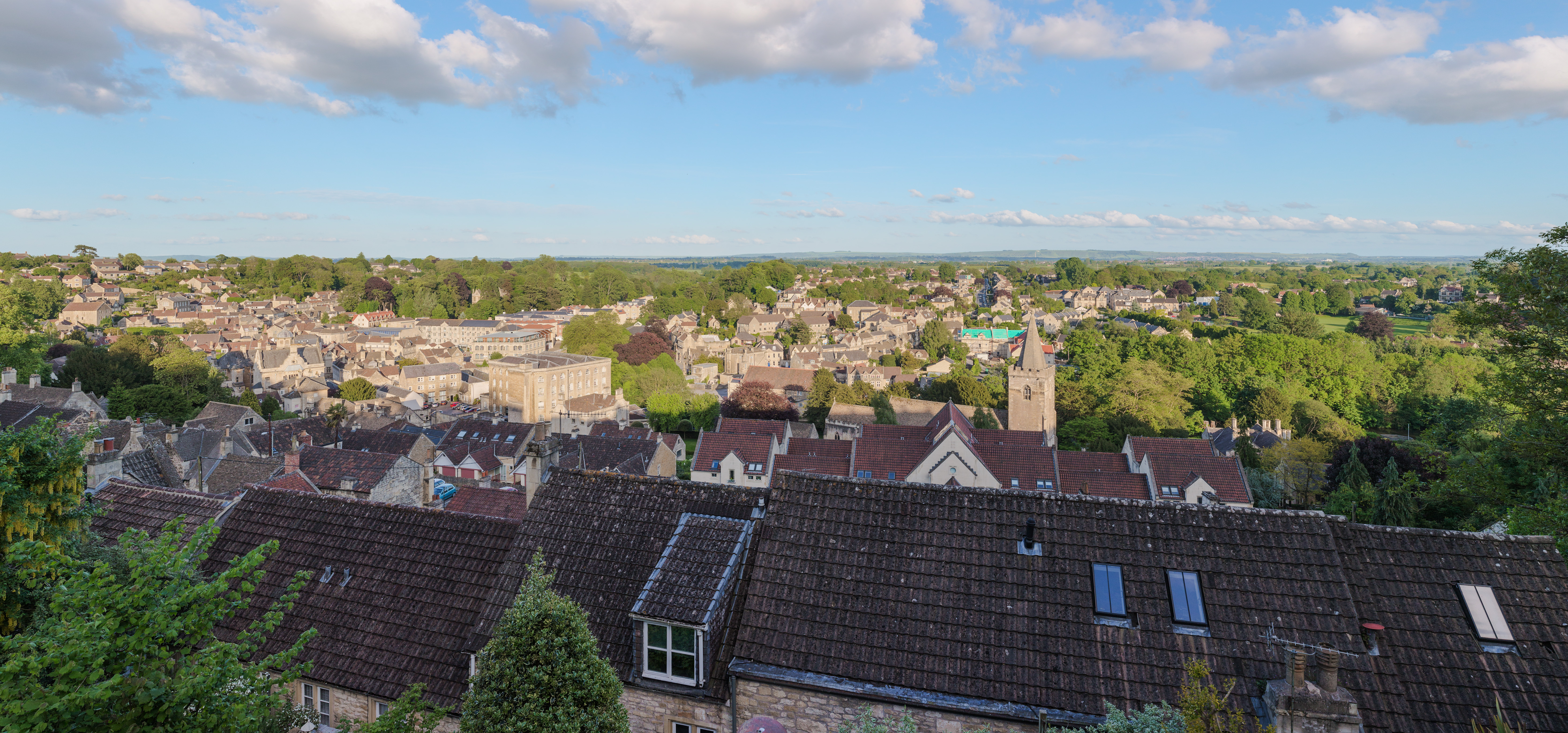
A panoramic view of Bradford from the north-west

Bradford on Avon was the site of an early factory for rubber products, established at Kingston Mill by Stephen Moulton in 1848 and later named George Spencer, Moulton and Co. The company was acquired by Avon Rubber, a large manufacturer of rubber products for the automotive and other industries, and production continued until 1993. Today, the town is the headquarters of the Alex Moulton bicycle company and has several other small-scale manufacturing enterprises.

The town's main business is shopping, tourism and day-to-day servicing of a population largely made up of families, commuters and the retired. The town has one mid-sized supermarket on the Elms Cross industrial estate and five convenience stores.

Approximately 120 feet south of the Town Bridge lies The Bridge Tea Rooms: A Victorian styled tea room housed in a building dating from 1502. The second story was added in 1675. It has been, at various times, a blacksmith's home and a tailor's workshop. It became a tea-room in 1989.

Local consumers founded Bradford on Avon Co-operative Society in 1861, which, in the 1960s, united with other consumer co-operatives in the district to merge with a national business. A mini outdoor shopping centre of independent shops, Weavers Walk, which describes itself as an "ethical trading centre", is in the town centre.

The town is an increasingly popular location for films, television adaptations and more; it has played host to Wolf Hall, Creation (a 2009 film about the life of Darwin), Robin of Sherwood and a 1972 film adaptation of The Canterbury Tales. In 2016, The White Princess TV series was filmed in the area.

== Transport ==
Bradford on Avon is on the A363 Trowbridge to Bath road, which runs through the town from south to north, and crossed over by the B3109 linking Bradford on Avon with Melksham and Frome. All other road routes are minor, affording access to local settlements. Bradford on Avon is about 15 miles (24 km) from junction 18 of the M4 motorway at Bath and the same distance from junction 17 at Chippenham.

Bradford-on-Avon railway station is served by Great Western Railway on the Wessex Main Line and Heart of Wessex Line routes. The line opened in the mid-19th century and was built by the original Great Western Railway. The main station building by Brunel is grade II listed.

Running parallel to the railway through the town is the Kennet and Avon Canal. The use of this canal declined as the railways grew but it was restored to full working order during the 1960s, 1970s and 1980s. The canal provides a link through to the Avon at Bath in the west, and the Thames at Reading in the east.

== Governance ==
Bradford on Avon civil parish elects a town council with twelve members: six for the North ward and six for the South ward. After the May 2025 elections, there were ten Liberal Democrat and two Independent councillors. The town council provides an increasing range of services in the town, building on its historically mostly consultative and ceremonial role. These include provision of youth services, management of significant and growing areas of green space and town facilities, and management of several premises within the town. Members of the council elect one of their number as the town's mayor, for a one-year term. The town council declared a climate emergency in March 2019 and has committed to becoming carbon neutral by 2030.

Statutory local government functions – including schools, roads, social services, emergency planning, leisure services, development control, and waste disposal – are carried out by Wiltshire Council, a unitary authority. The two electoral divisions of Bradford-on-Avon North and Bradford-on-Avon South each elect one member of Wiltshire Council. (The hyphenated forms are used in The Wiltshire (Electoral Changes) Order 2020).

For Westminster elections, Bradford on Avon is part of the Melksham and Devizes constituency, which was created following a boundary review and first contested at the 2024 general election when it was won by Brian Mathew for the Liberal Democrats. From 2010 to 2024, the town was in the Chippenham constituency.

In 1894 Bradford on Avon became an urban district, the district contained only the parish of Bradford on Avon. On 1 April 1974 the district and parish were abolished and became part of West Wiltshire district. A successor parish was formed covering the same area as the former district and its parish. In 2009 Bradford on Avon became part of Wiltshire district.

== Education ==
The town has a secondary school, St Laurence School, founded in 1980 as a result of the merger of Fitzmaurice Grammar School and Trinity Secondary Modern school. There are two primary schools: in the north of the town is Christ Church CofE (VC) Primary School, established as a national school in 1848 and on its present site since 1956, and in the south is Fitzmaurice Primary School, opened in 1928 as Bradford on Avon Council Junior Mixed and Infants' School.

== Media ==
Local news and television programmes are provided by BBC West and ITV West Country. Television signals are received from the Mendip TV transmitter and the local relay transmitters.

Local radio stations are BBC Radio Wiltshire on 104.3 FM, Heart West on 102.2, Greatest Hits Radio South West on 107.7 FM and West Wilts Radio, a community based radio station that broadcast online.

The Wiltshire Times is the local newspaper that serves the town.

== Sport and leisure ==
Bradford on Avon has a non-League football club, Bradford Town F.C., who play at the Sports and Social Club on Trowbridge Road. In addition to a bowls & croquet club, tennis courts and a swimming pool, there is also the Bradford on Avon Rowing Club, catering for rowing and canoeing from their base opposite Barton Farm country park. Bradford on Avon rugby club, whose first team played in Dorset & Wilts 1 North in 2019–20, have their ground at Winsley, just west of the town.

Wiltshire Music Centre is a purpose-built, 300-seat concert hall within the grounds of St Laurence School that attracts internationally renowned musicians.

== Notable people ==
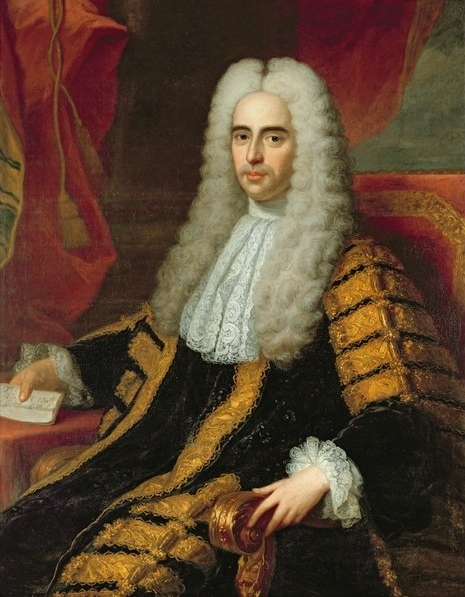
John Methuen

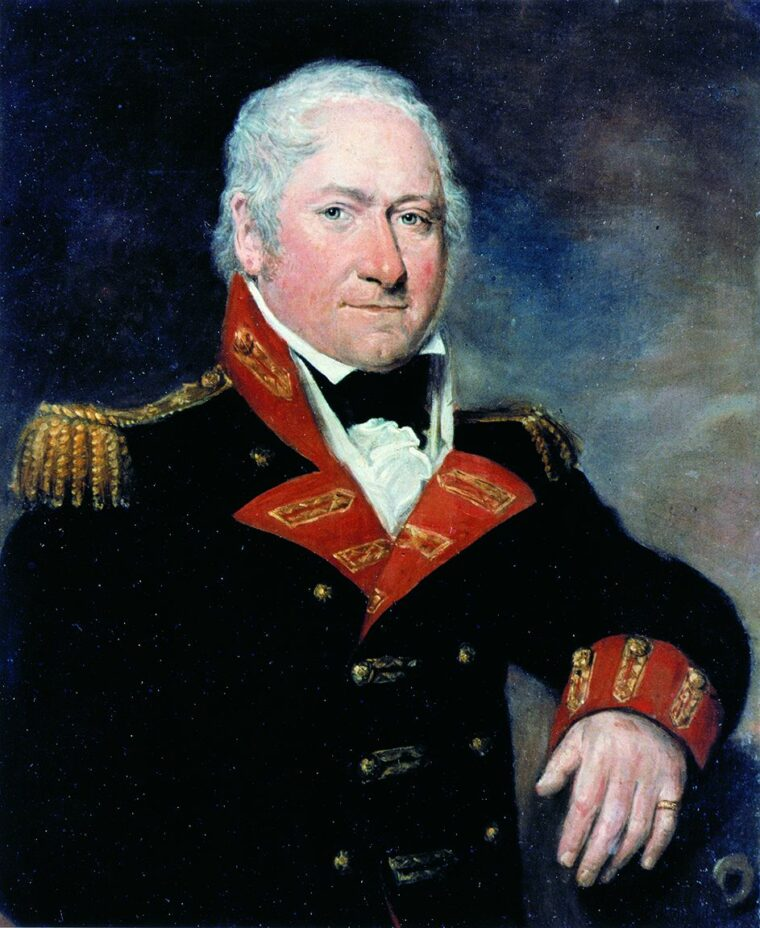
Henry Shrapnel, 1817

- Paul Methuen (1613–1667), clothier, lived and worked in Bradford on Avon.
- John Methuen (1650–1706), was born in Bradford on Avon, as was his son Sir Paul Methuen (ca.1672–1757); they were successively British Ambassadors to Portugal.
- Lieutenant General Henry Shrapnel (1761–1842), a British Army officer who invented the shrapnel shell, born at Midway Manor.
- Shadrack Byfield (1789–1874), War of 1812 infantryman and memoirist, born in Woolley, Bradford on Avon.
- E. H. Young (1880–1949), novelist, children's writer and mountaineer, lived in Bradford on Avon.
- Eric Derwent Walrond (1898–1966), Afro-Caribbean Harlem Renaissance writer and journalist, lived from 1939 to 1952 at 9 Ivy Terrace, Bradford on Avon.
- Alex Moulton (1920–2012), engineer and inventor, lived at The Hall, Bradford on Avon.
- Sir Donald Maitland (1922–2010), senior diplomat, lived in Bradford on Avon.
- Jonathan Newth (born 1939), stage and television actor, lives in Bradford on Avon.
- Hugh Scully (1943–2015) TV presenter, was born in Bradford on Avon.
- Paul Emsley (born 1947), artist, lives in Bradford on Avon.
- Peter Hammill (born 1948), singer-songwriter, lives in Bradford on Avon.
- Stephen Volk (born 1954), screenwriter, lives in Bradford on Avon.
- Simon R. Green (born 1955), science-fiction/fantasy author, was born in Bradford on Avon.
- Neil Taylor (born 1961), guitarist, was born in Bradford on Avon.
- Melanie Hall, hospital admin officer who was studying to be a nurse, disappeared in 1996 and presumed murdered; lived near the town.

=== Sportspeople ===
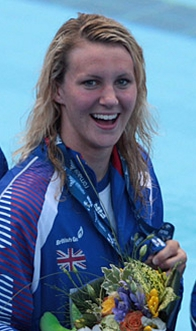
Jazmin Carlin, 2009

- Hannah Brown (born 1990), canoeist, lives in Bradford on Avon.
- Jazmin Carlin (born 1990), Olympic medallist in swimming, lived in Bradford on Avon while training at the University of Bath.
- Will Carling (born 1965), rugby union player with 72 caps for England, was born in Bradford on Avon.
- David Constant (born 1941), Test cricket umpire, was born in Bradford on Avon.
- Phil de Glanville (born 1968), rugby union player with 202 caps for Bath Rugby and 38 with England, has lived in Bradford on Avon.
- Paddy Edwards (born 1965), cricketer, was born in Bradford on Avon.
- Edgar Ford (1876–1943), cricketer, was born in Bradford on Avon.
- Ed McKeever (born 1983), Olympic canoeing champion, lives in Bradford on Avon.
- Lewis Moody (born 1978), rugby union player with 71 caps for England, lives in Bradford on Avon.
- Rob Newman (born 1963), footballer with 691 club caps, and later manager, was born in Bradford on Avon.
- Andy Pearce (born 1966), footballer, born in Bradford on Avon with 221 club caps.
- Fitzroy Simpson (born 1970), footballer, was born in Bradford on Avon; 486 club caps and 43 for Jamaica.

== Twin towns ==
Bradford on Avon is twinned with:

- Sully-sur-Loire, France
- Norden, Germany

== See also ==
- Listed buildings in Bradford on Avon
