= Listed buildings in Bradford on Avon =

Buildings in Bradford on Avon, Wiltshire, England

Bradford on Avon is a town and civil parish in Wiltshire, England. It contains 344 listed buildings that are recorded in the National Heritage List for England. Of these eight are grade I, 30 are grade II* and 306 are grade II.

This list is based on the information retrieved online from Historic England.

== Key ==
| Grade | Criteria |
|---|---|
| I | Buildings that are of exceptional interest |
| II* | Particularly important buildings of more than special interest |
| II | Buildings that are of special interest |

== Listing ==
| Name | Grade | Location | Type | Completed (Note: The date given is the date used by Historic England as significant for the initial building or that of an important part in the structure's description.) | Date designated | Grid ref. (Note: The grid reference is based on the British national grid reference system, sometimes known as OSGB36, used by the Ordnance Survey.) Geo-coordinates | Notes | Entry number (Note: The "List Entry Number" is a unique number assigned to each listed building and scheduled monument by Historic England.) | Image | Wikidata |
|---|---|---|---|---|---|---|---|---|---|---|
| The Town Bridge | I | Town Bridge and Chapel | | | 18 April 1952 | ST8261360901; 51°20′49″N 2°15′04″W | | 1036011 | The Town Bridge More images | Q17529397 |
| Stone Parapets to Front of Terraces on South and East Sides of the Chantry and Little Chantry | II | Barton Orchard | | | 23 August 1974 | ST8233160838; 51°20′47″N 2°15′18″W | | 1036012 | Upload Photo | Q26287610 |
| 9, Barton Orchard | II | 9, Barton Orchard | | | 23 August 1974 | ST8227360840; 51°20′47″N 2°15′21″W | | 1036013 | 9, Barton Orchard More images | Q26287612 |
| Two Gables | II | 30, Bath Road | | | 23 August 1974 | ST8251461559; 51°21′10″N 2°15′09″W | | 1036014 | Upload Photo | Q26287613 |
| Maplecroft | II | Bath Road | | | 23 August 1974 | ST8232362342; 51°21′36″N 2°15′19″W | | 1036015 | Upload Photo | Q26287614 |
| Berryfield House (maternity Hospital) | II | Bath Road | | | 23 August 1974 | ST8263061635; 51°21′13″N 2°15′03″W | | 1036016 | Upload Photo | Q26287615 |
| Well Close House | II* | 3, Belcombe Road | | | 23 August 1974 | ST8209660717; 51°20′43″N 2°15′30″W | | 1036017 | Upload Photo | Q17539896 |
| Belcombe Court | I | Belcombe Road | | | 18 April 1952 | ST8173860633; 51°20′40″N 2°15′49″W | | 1036018 | Belcombe Court More images | Q17529400 |
| Temple Approximately 32 Metres West of Belcombe Court | II* | Belcombe Road | | | 18 April 1952 | ST8170060621; 51°20′40″N 2°15′51″W | | 1036019 | Upload Photo | Q17539915 |
| Coachhouse Amd Attached Wall and Archway Immediately to East of Belcombe Court | II | Belcombe Road | | | 23 August 1974 | ST8177360652; 51°20′41″N 2°15′47″W | | 1036020 | Upload Photo | Q26287616 |
| Barn Approximately 20 Metres East of Belcombe Court | II | Belcombe Road | | | 23 August 1974 | ST8179760634; 51°20′40″N 2°15′46″W | | 1036021 | Upload Photo | Q26287617 |
| Grotto Approximately 20 Metres West of Belcombe Court and to North of Temple | II | Belcombe Road | | | 23 August 1974 | ST8170260641; 51°20′40″N 2°15′51″W | | 1036022 | Upload Photo | Q26287619 |
| Cottage Approximately 70 Metres West of Belcombe Court | II | Belcombe Road | | | 23 August 1974 | ST8163160633; 51°20′40″N 2°15′54″W | | 1036023 | Upload Photo | Q26287620 |
| 18, Bridge Street | II | 18, Bridge Street | | | 23 August 1974 | ST8264260843; 51°20′47″N 2°15′02″W | | 1036024 | 18, Bridge Street More images | Q26287621 |
| The Old Forge | II | Bridge Street | | | 23 August 1974 | ST8261460851; 51°20′47″N 2°15′04″W | | 1036025 | The Old Forge More images | Q26287622 |
| The Bridge Galleries | II | 24, Bridge Street | | | 18 April 1952 | ST8260760853; 51°20′47″N 2°15′04″W | | 1036026 | The Bridge Galleries More images | Q26287623 |
| 4, Budbury Place | II | 4, Budbury Place | | | 23 August 1974 | ST8222061136; 51°20′56″N 2°15′24″W | | 1036027 | Upload Photo | Q26287624 |
| Ye Old Bank House | II | 2, Church Street | | | 18 April 1952 | ST8259460989; 51°20′52″N 2°15′05″W | | 1036028 | Ye Old Bank House More images | Q26287625 |
| 3, Church Street | II | 3, Church Street | | | 18 April 1952 | ST8258660988; 51°20′52″N 2°15′05″W | | 1036029 | 3, Church Street More images | Q26287627 |
| Churchyard Gatepiers and Gates to East of Holy Trinity Church | II | Church Street | | | 23 August 1974 | ST8245260893; 51°20′49″N 2°15′12″W | | 1036030 | Upload Photo | Q26287628 |
| Gatepiers at East End of Drive to No 7 (vicarage) | II | Church Street | | | 23 August 1974 | ST8246460884; 51°20′48″N 2°15′11″W | | 1036031 | Gatepiers at East End of Drive to No 7 (vicarage) More images | Q26287629 |
| Building Next West of No 8 | II | Church Street | | | 23 August 1974 | ST8234160866; 51°20′48″N 2°15′18″W | | 1036032 | Building Next West of No 8 More images | Q26287630 |
| 9 and 9a, Church Street | II | 9 and 9a, Church Street | | | 7 November 1963 | ST8238060886; 51°20′48″N 2°15′16″W | | 1036033 | 9 and 9a, Church Street More images | Q26287631 |
| Church of St Lawrence | I | Church Street | | | 18 April 1952 | ST8241960914; 51°20′49″N 2°15′14″W | | 1036034 | Church of St Lawrence More images | Q2323982 |
| Dutch Barton Cottage | II | 15a, Church Street | | | 18 April 1952 | ST8247760961; 51°20′51″N 2°15′11″W | | 1036035 | Upload Photo | Q26287632 |
| Girl Guide Headquarters | II | 18, Church Street | | | 23 August 1974 | ST8246760979; 51°20′51″N 2°15′11″W | | 1036036 | Girl Guide Headquarters More images | Q26287633 |
| Wallington Hall | II* | Church Street, Bradford On Avon, BA15 1LN | | | 18 April 1952 | ST8250860979; 51°20′51″N 2°15′09″W | | 1036037 | Wallington Hall More images | Q17539934 |
| Stone Wall, Steps And Gatepiers To Forecourt Of No 29 | II | 29, Church Street | | | 23 August 1974 | ST8253860990; 51°20′52″N 2°15′08″W | | 1036038 | Stone Wall, Steps And Gatepiers To Forecourt Of No 29 More images | Q26287634 |
| 9, Coppice Hill | II | 9, Coppice Hill | | | 18 April 1952 | ST8266061060; 51°20′54″N 2°15′01″W | | 1036039 | 9, Coppice Hill More images | Q26287636 |
| 10-12, Coppice Hill | II | 10-12, Coppice Hill | | | 23 August 1974 | ST8266361069; 51°20′54″N 2°15′01″W | | 1036040 | 10-12, Coppice Hill More images | Q26287637 |
| Coppice Lodge | II | 14, Coppice Hill | | | 7 November 1963 | ST8263961109; 51°20′56″N 2°15′02″W | | 1036041 | Upload Photo | Q26287638 |
| Small Corner | II | 15, Coppice Hill | | | 27 November 1963 | ST8265761085; 51°20′55″N 2°15′01″W | | 1036042 | Small Corner More images | Q26287639 |
| 16, Coppice Hill | II | 16, Coppice Hill | | | 23 August 1974 | ST8266261099; 51°20′55″N 2°15′01″W | | 1036043 | Upload Photo | Q26287640 |
| 19, Coppice Hill | II | 19, Coppice Hill | | | 18 April 1952 | ST8266461088; 51°20′55″N 2°15′01″W | | 1036044 | 19, Coppice Hill More images | Q26287641 |
| Wesleyan Methodist Church | II | Coppice Hill | | | 23 August 1974 | ST8267761103; 51°20′55″N 2°15′00″W | | 1036045 | Upload Photo | Q26287642 |
| Former Wesleyan Methodist Church | II* | Coppice Hill | | | 18 April 1952 | ST8267361129; 51°20′56″N 2°15′01″W | | 1036046 | Former Wesleyan Methodist Church More images | Q17539950 |
| Wall and Gate to North of Former Wesleyan Methodist Church | II | Coppice Hill | | | 23 August 1974 | ST8268161164; 51°20′57″N 2°15′00″W | | 1036047 | Upload Photo | Q26287643 |
| 4 Gates With Lamp Bracket Over At South End Of Pathway Leading To Former Wesleyan Methodist Church | II | Coppice Hill | | | 23 August 1974 | ST8267061082; 51°20′55″N 2°15′01″W | | 1036048 | 4 Gates With Lamp Bracket Over At South End Of Pathway Leading To Former Wesleyan Methodist Church More images | Q26287644 |
| 21, Coppice Hill | II | 21, Coppice Hill | | | 18 April 1952 | ST8268961089; 51°20′55″N 2°15′00″W | | 1036049 | 21, Coppice Hill More images | Q26287646 |
| 22 and 23, Coppice Hill | II | 22 and 23, Coppice Hill | | | 23 August 1974 | ST8267061044; 51°20′54″N 2°15′01″W | | 1036050 | 22 and 23, Coppice Hill More images | Q26287647 |
| The King's Arms Hotel | II | Coppice Hill | | | 23 August 1974 | ST8266861009; 51°20′52″N 2°15′01″W | | 1036051 | The King's Arms Hotel More images | Q26287648 |
| 14, Frome Road | II | 14, Frome Road | | | 23 August 1974 | ST8257660258; 51°20′28″N 2°15′06″W | | 1036052 | 14, Frome Road More images | Q26287649 |
| Terraces with Ornamental Balustrades and Steps to South of the Hall, Including Retaining Walls Running To East And West And Garden Wall With Gatepiers To East Side Of Terraces | II* | Holt Road | | | 23 August 1974 | ST8285660886; 51°20′48″N 2°14′51″W | | 1036053 | Upload Photo | Q17539969 |
| Garden Seat with Portico in Grounds to East of the Hall | II | Holt Road | | | 23 August 1974 | ST8295960812; 51°20′46″N 2°14′46″W | | 1036054 | Upload Photo | Q26287650 |
| 2-5, Huntingdon Street | II | 2-5, Huntingdon Street | | | 23 August 1974 | ST8235361392; 51°21′05″N 2°15′17″W | | 1036055 | Upload Photo | Q26287651 |
| 16-20, Huntingdon Street | II | 16-20, Huntingdon Street | | | 23 August 1974 | ST8232461553; 51°21′10″N 2°15′19″W | | 1036056 | Upload Photo | Q26287652 |
| 2, Kingston Road | II | 2, Kingston Road | | | 23 August 1974 | ST8271260990; 51°20′52″N 2°14′59″W | | 1036057 | 2, Kingston Road More images | Q26287653 |
| Gatepiers and Gates at East End of Wall Along South Side of Grounds to the Hall | II | Kingston Road | | | 23 August 1974 | ST8287460838; 51°20′47″N 2°14′50″W | | 1036058 | Upload Photo | Q26287654 |
| Bradford on Avon District Hospital Leigh House | II | Leigh Road | | | 23 August 1974 | ST8308561873; 51°21′20″N 2°14′39″W | | 1036059 | Upload Photo | Q26287656 |
| 10-13, Market Street | II | 10-13, Market Street | | | 23 August 1974 | ST8253761089; 51°20′55″N 2°15′08″W | | 1036060 | 10-13, Market Street More images | Q26287658 |
| 15, Market Street | II | 15, Market Street | | | 23 August 1974 | ST8254961078; 51°20′55″N 2°15′07″W | | 1036061 | Upload Photo | Q26287659 |
| 18, Market Street | II | 18, Market Street | | | 23 August 1974 | ST8256461068; 51°20′54″N 2°15′06″W | | 1036062 | 18, Market Street More images | Q26287660 |
| 19, Market Street | II | 19, Market Street | | | 23 August 1974 | ST8257161067; 51°20′54″N 2°15′06″W | | 1036063 | 19, Market Street More images | Q26287661 |
| 20, Market Street | II | 20, Market Street | | | 18 April 1952 | ST8257861069; 51°20′54″N 2°15′06″W | | 1036064 | 20, Market Street More images | Q26287664 |
| 21, Market Street | II | 21, Market Street | | | 18 April 1952 | ST8258261065; 51°20′54″N 2°15′05″W | | 1036065 | 21, Market Street More images | Q26287666 |
| 23, Market Street | II | 23, Market Street | | | 23 August 1974 | ST8258961066; 51°20′54″N 2°15′05″W | | 1036066 | 23, Market Street More images | Q26287667 |
| 24, Market Street | II | 24, Market Street | | | 18 April 1952 | ST8259061062; 51°20′54″N 2°15′05″W | | 1036067 | 24, Market Street More images | Q26287669 |
| Section Of Elevated Pavement In Front Of No 21, Plus Wall Running To Left, And Steps With Pathway Leading North Between No 21 And Nos 23 And 24 | II | 21, 23 and 24, Market Street | | | 23 August 1974 | ST8258461059; 51°20′54″N 2°15′05″W | | 1036068 | Upload Photo | Q26287670 |
| 25 and 26, Market Street | II | 25 and 26, Market Street | | | 18 April 1952 | ST8259161054; 51°20′54″N 2°15′05″W | | 1036069 | 25 and 26, Market Street More images | Q26287671 |
| 28, Market Street | II | 28, Market Street | | | 23 August 1974 | ST8259461044; 51°20′54″N 2°15′05″W | | 1036070 | 28, Market Street More images | Q26287672 |
| Former Methodist Chapel to Rear of No 29 Town Club | II* | Market Street | | | 23 August 1974 | ST8259961042; 51°20′53″N 2°15′04″W | | 1036071 | Former Methodist Chapel to Rear of No 29 Town Club More images | Q17539987 |
| 32, Market Street | II | 32, Market Street | | | 23 August 1974 | ST8260561029; 51°20′53″N 2°15′04″W | | 1036072 | 32, Market Street More images | Q26287673 |
| 35, Market Street | II | 35, Market Street | | | 23 August 1974 | ST8261961016; 51°20′53″N 2°15′03″W | | 1036073 | 35, Market Street More images | Q26287674 |
| Christ Church Vicarage | II | 3, Mason's Lane | | | 23 August 1974 | ST8270861206; 51°20′59″N 2°14′59″W | | 1036074 | Upload Photo | Q26287675 |
| Round House | II | 4, Mason's Lane | | | 23 August 1974 | ST8271561155; 51°20′57″N 2°14′58″W | | 1036075 | Upload Photo | Q26287676 |
| 9, Mason's Lane | II | 9, Mason's Lane | | | 23 August 1974 | ST8258761138; 51°20′57″N 2°15′05″W | | 1036076 | Upload Photo | Q26287678 |
| Christ Church | II* | Mount Pleasant | | | 18 April 1952 | ST8275561357; 51°21′04″N 2°14′56″W | | 1036077 | Christ Church More images | Q5108672 |
| Castle Hotel | II | Mount Pleasant | | | 23 August 1974 | ST8275361283; 51°21′01″N 2°14′57″W | | 1036078 | Castle Hotel More images | Q26287679 |
| Two Boundary Walls to East and West Sides of Grounds at Priory Lodge | II | Market Street | | | 23 August 1974 | ST8253061081; 51°20′55″N 2°15′08″W | | 1036079 | Upload Photo | Q26287680 |
| 1, Newtown | II | 1, Newtown | | | 23 August 1974 | ST8244461036; 51°20′53″N 2°15′12″W | | 1036080 | 1, Newtown More images | Q26287681 |
| Priory Steps | II | 2 and 3, Newtown | | | 23 August 1974 | ST8243561028; 51°20′53″N 2°15′13″W | | 1036081 | Upload Photo | Q26287682 |
| Grey Gables | II | 13, Newtown | | | 23 August 1974 | ST8217360764; 51°20′44″N 2°15′26″W | | 1036082 | Grey Gables More images | Q26287683 |
| 17 and 18, Newtown | II | 17 and 18, Newtown | | | 23 August 1974 | ST8219060766; 51°20′44″N 2°15′26″W | | 1036083 | 17 and 18, Newtown More images | Q26287684 |
| 19, Newtown | II | 19, Newtown | | | 23 August 1974 | ST8221660806; 51°20′46″N 2°15′24″W | | 1036084 | 19, Newtown More images | Q26287685 |
| 27-31, Newtown | II | 27-31, Newtown | | | 23 August 1974 | ST8226860877; 51°20′48″N 2°15′22″W | | 1036085 | Upload Photo | Q26287686 |
| 33, Newtown | II | 33, Newtown | | | 23 August 1974 | ST8229260904; 51°20′49″N 2°15′20″W | | 1036086 | 33, Newtown More images | Q26287688 |
| 38 and 39, Newtown | II | 38 and 39, Newtown, BA15 1NG | | | 23 August 1974 | ST8230560918; 51°20′49″N 2°15′20″W | | 1036087 | 38 and 39, Newtown More images | Q26287690 |
| 40, Newtown | II | 40, Newtown, BA15 1NG | | | 23 August 1974 | ST8231460929; 51°20′50″N 2°15′19″W | | 1036088 | 40, Newtown More images | Q26287691 |
| 41, Newtown | II | 41, Newtown | | | 23 August 1974 | ST8231960936; 51°20′50″N 2°15′19″W | | 1036089 | 41, Newtown More images | Q26287692 |
| 42 and 43, Newtown | II | 42 and 43, Newtown | | | 23 August 1974 | ST8232360942; 51°20′50″N 2°15′19″W | | 1036090 | 42 and 43, Newtown More images | Q26287693 |
| 44, Newtown | II | 44, Newtown | | | 23 August 1974 | ST8233060948; 51°20′50″N 2°15′18″W | | 1036091 | 44, Newtown More images | Q26287694 |
| 47 and 48, Newtown | II | 47 and 48, Newtown | | | 23 August 1974 | ST8234360964; 51°20′51″N 2°15′18″W | | 1036092 | 47 and 48, Newtown More images | Q26287695 |
| 49, Newtown | II | 49, Newtown | | | 23 August 1974 | ST8235060969; 51°20′51″N 2°15′17″W | | 1036093 | 49, Newtown More images | Q26287697 |
| 53-59, Newtown | II* | 53-59, Newtown | | | 7 November 1963 | ST8239061006; 51°20′52″N 2°15′15″W | | 1036094 | 53-59, Newtown More images | Q17540016 |
| 2 Gatepiers At East End Of Northleigh | II | Northleigh | | | 23 August 1974 | ST8318861980; 51°21′24″N 2°14′34″W | | 1036095 | Upload Photo | Q26287698 |
| The Granary at Barton Farm | I | Pound Lane | | | 18 April 1952 | ST8234560462; 51°20′35″N 2°15′17″W | | 1036096 | The Granary at Barton Farm More images | Q17529408 |
| Outbuilding Immediately to North West of Tithe Barn at Barton Farm | II | Pound Lane | | | 23 August 1974 | ST8229660465; 51°20′35″N 2°15′20″W | | 1036097 | Upload Photo | Q26287699 |
| Morgans Lodge | II | 8, St Margaret's Hill | | | 18 April 1952 | ST8262160790; 51°20′45″N 2°15′03″W | | 1036098 | Upload Photo | Q26287700 |
| 2, St Margaret's Place | II | 2, St Margaret's Place | | | 23 August 1974 | ST8261860709; 51°20′43″N 2°15′03″W | | 1036099 | Upload Photo | Q26287701 |
| 4, St Margaret's Place | II | 4, St Margaret's Place | | | 18 April 1952 | ST8262560721; 51°20′43″N 2°15′03″W | | 1036100 | Upload Photo | Q26287702 |
| 7, St Margaret's Place | II | 7, St Margaret's Place | | | 23 August 1974 | ST8264760750; 51°20′44″N 2°15′02″W | | 1036101 | Upload Photo | Q26287704 |
| Garden Wall and Gatepiers to the Garden Opposite No 4 | II | St Margaret's Place | | | 23 August 1974 | ST8263360714; 51°20′43″N 2°15′03″W | | 1036102 | Upload Photo | Q26287705 |
| Stone Urn on Ashlar Pedestal in Garden Opposite No 5 | II | St Margaret's Place | | | 23 August 1974 | ST8264160720; 51°20′43″N 2°15′02″W | | 1036103 | Upload Photo | Q26287706 |
| Liberal Club | II | St Margaret's Street | | | 23 August 1974 | ST8255960836; 51°20′47″N 2°15′06″W | | 1036104 | Liberal Club More images | Q26287707 |
| 10, St Margaret's Street | II | 10, St Margaret's Street | | | 23 August 1974 | ST8254960799; 51°20′46″N 2°15′07″W | | 1036105 | 10, St Margaret's Street More images | Q26287708 |
| 12 and 12a, St Margaret's Street | II | 12 and 12a, St Margaret's Street | | | 23 August 1974 | ST8255760782; 51°20′45″N 2°15′07″W | | 1036106 | Upload Photo | Q26287709 |
| 13 and 14a, St Margaret's Street | II | 13 and 14a, St Margaret's Street | | | 23 August 1974 | ST8256160769; 51°20′45″N 2°15′06″W | | 1036107 | 13 and 14a, St Margaret's Street More images | Q26287710 |
| No 14b with Archway to Right | II | 14b, St Margaret's Street | | | 18 April 1952 | ST8256860751; 51°20′44″N 2°15′06″W | | 1036108 | No 14b with Archway to Right More images | Q26287711 |
| Baptist Chapel | II | St Margaret's Street | | | 18 April 1952 | ST8258360761; 51°20′44″N 2°15′05″W | | 1036109 | Upload Photo | Q26287712 |
| 15, St Margaret's Street | II | 15, St Margaret's Street | | | 27 November 1963 | ST8257660744; 51°20′44″N 2°15′06″W | | 1036110 | 15, St Margaret's Street More images | Q26287714 |
| 16, St Margaret's Street | II | 16, St Margaret's Street | | | 27 November 1963 | ST8258160741; 51°20′44″N 2°15′05″W | | 1036111 | 16, St Margaret's Street More images | Q26287715 |
| Church Hall Congregational Church | II | St Margaret's Street | | | 18 April 1952 | ST8262360739; 51°20′44″N 2°15′03″W | | 1036112 | Upload Photo | Q26287716 |
| Dolphin House | II | 19 and 20, St Margaret's Street | | | 23 August 1974 | ST8260060714; 51°20′43″N 2°15′04″W | | 1036113 | Upload Photo | Q26287717 |
| 22, St Margaret's Street | II | 22, St Margaret's Street | | | 23 August 1974 | ST8260860699; 51°20′42″N 2°15′04″W | | 1036114 | Upload Photo | Q26287718 |
| 36, St Margaret's Street | II | 36, St Margaret's Street | | | 23 August 1974 | ST8258560701; 51°20′42″N 2°15′05″W | | 1036115 | 36, St Margaret's Street More images | Q26287719 |
| 42 and 43, St Margaret's Street | II | 42 and 43, St Margaret's Street | | | 18 April 1952 | ST8253360779; 51°20′45″N 2°15′08″W | | 1036116 | Upload Photo | Q26287720 |
| Glenavon | II | 46, St Margaret's Street | | | 18 April 1952 | ST8252560807; 51°20′46″N 2°15′08″W | | 1036117 | Glenavon More images | Q26287721 |
| Rowing Club | II | 49, St Margaret's Street | | | 18 April 1952 | ST8249360835; 51°20′47″N 2°15′10″W | | 1036118 | Upload Photo | Q26287722 |
| Westbury House. Railings Along East Side and Walled Forecourt to South of Westbury House | II* | St Margaret's Street | | | 18 April 1952 | ST8253960857; 51°20′47″N 2°15′08″W | | 1036119 | Westbury House. Railings Along East Side and Walled Forecourt to South of Westbury House More images | Q17540034 |
| War Memorial in Grounds to East of Westbury House | II | St Margaret's Street | | | 23 August 1974 | ST8255760875; 51°20′48″N 2°15′07″W | | 1036120 | War Memorial in Grounds to East of Westbury House More images | Q26287724 |
| 5 The Shambles | II | 5, The Shambles | | | 18 April 1952 | ST8265361010; 51°20′52″N 2°15′02″W | | 1036121 | 5 The Shambles More images | Q26287725 |
| The Lock Up | II | 6, The Shambles | | | 18 April 1952 | ST8265860997; 51°20′52″N 2°15′01″W | | 1036122 | The Lock Up More images | Q26287726 |
| 2 and 3, Silver Street | II | 2 and 3, Silver Street | | | 23 August 1974 | ST8263460958; 51°20′51″N 2°15′03″W | | 1036123 | 2 and 3, Silver Street More images | Q26287727 |
| 9a, Silver Street | II | 9a, Silver Street | | | 23 August 1974 | ST8271061019; 51°20′53″N 2°14′59″W | | 1036124 | 9a, Silver Street More images | Q26287728 |
| Silver Street House | II* | 13, Silver Street | | | 18 April 1952 | ST8273461034; 51°20′53″N 2°14′57″W | | 1036125 | Silver Street House More images | Q17540048 |
| 15, Silver Street | II | 15, Silver Street | | | 23 August 1974 | ST8276561034; 51°20′53″N 2°14′56″W | | 1036126 | 15, Silver Street More images | Q26287729 |
| The Old House | II | 18, Silver Street | | | 18 April 1952 | ST8279361005; 51°20′52″N 2°14′54″W | | 1036127 | The Old House More images | Q26287730 |
| 22, Silver Street | II | 22, Silver Street | | | 23 August 1974 | ST8277361017; 51°20′53″N 2°14′55″W | | 1036128 | 22, Silver Street More images | Q26287731 |
| 23, Silver Street | II | 23, Silver Street | | | 23 August 1974 | ST8276361019; 51°20′53″N 2°14′56″W | | 1036129 | 23, Silver Street More images | Q26287732 |
| 27, Silver Street | II | 27, Silver Street | | | 23 August 1974 | ST8271461007; 51°20′52″N 2°14′59″W | | 1036130 | 27, Silver Street More images | Q26287734 |
| 28, Silver Street | II | 28, Silver Street, Bradford On Avon, BA15 1JY | | | 18 April 1952 | ST8271161003; 51°20′52″N 2°14′59″W | | 1036131 | 28, Silver Street More images | Q26287735 |
| 29, Silver Street | II | 29, Silver Street | | | 18 April 1952 | ST8270360999; 51°20′52″N 2°14′59″W | | 1036132 | 29, Silver Street More images | Q26287736 |
| 30, Silver Street | II | 30, Silver Street | | | 18 April 1952 | ST8269060988; 51°20′52″N 2°15′00″W | | 1036133 | 30, Silver Street More images | Q26287737 |
| 31, Silver Street | II | 31, Silver Street | | | 18 April 1952 | ST8267960988; 51°20′52″N 2°15′00″W | | 1036134 | 31, Silver Street More images | Q26287738 |
| 33, Silver Street | II | 33, Silver Street | | | 18 April 1952 | ST8266660977; 51°20′51″N 2°15′01″W | | 1036135 | Upload Photo | Q26287739 |
| Lamb Building (Building 70), Kingston Mills | II | Kingston Mills, Silver Street | | | 23 August 1974 | ST8264760925; 51°20′50″N 2°15′02″W | | 1036136 | Lamb Building (Building 70), Kingston Mills More images | Q26287740 |
| Greystones | II | 8, Sladesbrook | | | 23 August 1974 | ST8295261476; 51°21′08″N 2°14′46″W | | 1036137 | Upload Photo | Q26287742 |
| 1-25, Tory | II | 1-25, Tory | | | 7 November 1963 | ST8232561028; 51°20′53″N 2°15′19″W | | 1036138 | Upload Photo | Q26287743 |
| 33-37, Tory | II* | 33-37, Tory | | | 7 November 1963 | ST8225560937; 51°20′50″N 2°15′22″W | | 1036139 | Upload Photo | Q17540069 |
| St Mary's Chapel and Attached Cottage (sometimes Known As the Hermitage) | II | Tory | | | 18 April 1952 | ST8224160899; 51°20′49″N 2°15′23″W | | 1036140 | St Mary's Chapel and Attached Cottage (sometimes Known As the Hermitage) More images | Q26287744 |
| 5, Trowbridge Road | II | 5, Trowbridge Road | | | 23 August 1974 | ST8270760571; 51°20′38″N 2°14′59″W | | 1036141 | Upload Photo | Q26287745 |
| 2 and 3, White Hill | II | 2 and 3, White Hill | | | 23 August 1974 | ST8277561039; 51°20′53″N 2°14′55″W | | 1036142 | 2 and 3, White Hill More images | Q26287746 |
| No 8 and Wall Attached to North of No 8 | II | 8, White Hill | | | 23 August 1974 | ST8277961055; 51°20′54″N 2°14′55″W | | 1036143 | No 8 and Wall Attached to North of No 8 More images | Q26287747 |
| 44, White Hill | II | 44, White Hill | | | 23 August 1974 | ST8282261198; 51°20′59″N 2°14′53″W | | 1036144 | Upload Photo | Q26287749 |
| Forecourt And Railings Of Manor House Manor House | II* | Whitehead's Lane | | | 18 April 1952 | ST8277461101; 51°20′55″N 2°14′55″W | | 1036145 | Upload Photo | Q17540083 |
| Gazebo Attached Wall To South With Archway, To West Of Manor House Garden | II | Whitehead's Lane | | | 18 April 1952 | ST8275861095; 51°20′55″N 2°14′56″W | | 1036146 | Upload Photo | Q26287750 |
| 6-11, Whitehead's Lane | II | 6-11, Whitehead's Lane | | | 23 August 1974 | ST8275161065; 51°20′54″N 2°14′57″W | | 1036147 | Upload Photo | Q26287751 |
| 1 and 3, Wine Street | II | 1 and 3, Wine Street | | | 18 April 1952 | ST8218760806; 51°20′46″N 2°15′26″W | | 1036148 | 1 and 3, Wine Street More images | Q26287752 |
| 35, Wine Street | II | 35, Wine Street | | | 23 August 1974 | ST8214560944; 51°20′50″N 2°15′28″W | | 1036149 | Upload Photo | Q26287753 |
| 1 and 2, Winsley Road | II | 1 and 2, Winsley Road | | | 23 August 1974 | ST8267261353; 51°21′04″N 2°15′01″W | | 1036150 | Upload Photo | Q26287754 |
| Woolley Grange | II* | Woolley Green | | | 23 August 1974 | ST8367461553; 51°21′10″N 2°14′09″W | | 1036151 | Woolley Grange More images | Q17540119 |
| 3, Woolley Green | II | 3, Woolley Green | | | 23 August 1974 | ST8373961707; 51°21′15″N 2°14′06″W | | 1036152 | Upload Photo | Q26287755 |
| Woolley Green House | II | Woolley Green | | | 23 August 1974 | ST8380361700; 51°21′15″N 2°14′02″W | | 1036153 | Woolley Green House More images | Q26287757 |
| Woolley Green Lodge | II | Woolley Green | | | 23 August 1974 | ST8382361734; 51°21′16″N 2°14′01″W | | 1036154 | Upload Photo | Q26287758 |
| 12 and 13, Woolley Green | II | 12 and 13, Woolley Green | | | 23 August 1974 | ST8377661599; 51°21′12″N 2°14′04″W | | 1036155 | Upload Photo | Q26287759 |
| Wall with Two Archways Attached to North Side of Nos 12 and 13 | II | Woolley Green | | | 23 August 1974 | ST8378961630; 51°21′13″N 2°14′03″W | | 1036156 | Upload Photo | Q26287760 |
| 1, Woolley Street | II | 1, Woolley Street | | | 23 August 1974 | ST8279461029; 51°20′53″N 2°14′54″W | | 1036157 | 1, Woolley Street More images | Q26287761 |
| Audleys | II | 5, Woolley Street | | | 18 April 1952 | ST8280861020; 51°20′53″N 2°14′54″W | | 1036158 | Audleys More images | Q26287762 |
| Cranford | II | 11, Woolley Street | | | 23 August 1974 | ST8282761008; 51°20′52″N 2°14′53″W | | 1036159 | Cranford More images | Q26287764 |
| Kingstone Lodge | II | 13, Woolley Street | | | 23 August 1974 | ST8283461002; 51°20′52″N 2°14′52″W | | 1036160 | Kingstone Lodge More images | Q26287765 |
| Moxhams | II* | 17, Woolley Street | | | 18 April 1952 | ST8285060984; 51°20′52″N 2°14′51″W | | 1036161 | Moxhams More images | Q17540132 |
| Woolley Hill House | II | Woolley Street | | | 23 August 1974 | ST8306261035; 51°20′53″N 2°14′41″W | | 1036162 | Upload Photo | Q26287766 |
| The Old Brewery with Wall Enclosing Courtyard | II | Newtown | | | 15 July 1986 | ST8221760838; 51°20′47″N 2°15′24″W | | 1036164 | The Old Brewery with Wall Enclosing Courtyard More images | Q26287767 |
| The Post Office | II | The Shambles | | | 9 May 1989 | ST8263460990; 51°20′52″N 2°15′03″W | | 1036165 | The Post Office More images | Q26287768 |
| K6 Telephone Kiosk | II | Newtown | | | 31 January 1989 | ST8226660852; 51°20′47″N 2°15′22″W | | 1036166 | K6 Telephone Kiosk More images | Q26287769 |
| Terrace Wall Immediately to North of Belcombe Court | II | Belcombe Road | | | 12 October 1990 | ST8174160658; 51°20′41″N 2°15′49″W | | 1036167 | Upload Photo | Q26287770 |
| Garden Seat Approximately 30 Metres South West of Belcombe Court | II | Belcombe Road | | | 12 October 1990 | ST8172060592; 51°20′39″N 2°15′50″W | | 1036168 | Upload Photo | Q26287772 |
| Gazebo Approximately 340 Metres North West of Belcombe Court | II | Belcombe Road | | | 12 October 1990 | ST8142760810; 51°20′46″N 2°16′05″W | | 1036169 | Upload Photo | Q26287773 |
| Barn at Maplecroft Farm | II | Bath Road | | | 14 October 1991 | ST8239562352; 51°21′36″N 2°15′15″W | | 1036170 | Upload Photo | Q26287774 |
| South Platform Building, Railway Station | II | Railway Station | | | 8 October 1992 | ST8252660662; 51°20′41″N 2°15′08″W | | 1036171 | South Platform Building, Railway Station More images | Q26287775 |
| 3 and 4, Market Street | II | 3 and 4, Market Street | | | 7 December 1992 | ST8258461021; 51°20′53″N 2°15′05″W | | 1036172 | 3 and 4, Market Street More images | Q26287776 |
| 5-8, Market Street | II | 5-8, Market Street | | | 8 December 1972 | ST8257161044; 51°20′54″N 2°15′06″W | | 1183974 | 5-8, Market Street More images | Q26479275 |
| 33, Market Street | II | 33, Market Street | | | 23 August 1974 | ST8261061025; 51°20′53″N 2°15′04″W | | 1184032 | 33, Market Street More images | Q26479336 |
| 37, Market Street | II | 37, Market Street | | | 23 August 1974 | ST8263460979; 51°20′51″N 2°15′03″W | | 1184057 | 37, Market Street More images | Q26479363 |
| Ivy Terrace | II | 2-4, Mason's Lane | | | 23 August 1974 | ST8273561247; 51°21′00″N 2°14′57″W | | 1184062 | Upload Photo | Q26479367 |
| 5 and 6, Mason's Lane | II | 5 and 6, Mason's Lane | | | 23 August 1974 | ST8269561154; 51°20′57″N 2°15′00″W | | 1184071 | Upload Photo | Q26479379 |
| Zion Baptist Church | II | Middle Rank | | | 18 April 1952 | ST8239661053; 51°20′54″N 2°15′15″W | | 1184076 | Upload Photo | Q26479385 |
| Priory Lodge | II | Newtown | | | 23 August 1974 | ST8251461066; 51°20′54″N 2°15′09″W | | 1184124 | Priory Lodge More images | Q26479435 |
| 1A, Newtown And Gatepiers To Left Of 1A | II | 1a, Newtown, BA15 1NQ | | | 23 August 1974 | ST8245561044; 51°20′54″N 2°15′12″W | | 1184134 | Upload Photo | Q26479448 |
| 5, Newtown | II | 5, Newtown | | | 23 August 1974 | ST8227860866; 51°20′48″N 2°15′21″W | | 1184143 | 5, Newtown More images | Q26479459 |
| Bell House | II | 62 and 62b, Newtown | | | 18 April 1952 | ST8241761031; 51°20′53″N 2°15′14″W | | 1184198 | Bell House More images | Q26479519 |
| Barton Farmhouse | I | Pound Lane | | | 18 April 1952 | ST8233660506; 51°20′36″N 2°15′18″W | | 1184214 | Barton Farmhouse More images | Q17529586 |
| Tithe Barn at Barton Farm | I | Pound Lane | | | 18 April 1952 | ST8231760433; 51°20′34″N 2°15′19″W | | 1184239 | Tithe Barn at Barton Farm More images | Q15275600 |
| 6, St Margaret's Place | II | 6, St Margaret's Place | | | 27 November 1963 | ST8264360745; 51°20′44″N 2°15′02″W | | 1184263 | Upload Photo | Q26479587 |
| 8 and 9, St Margaret's Place | II | 8 and 9, St Margaret's Place | | | 23 August 1974 | ST8265260756; 51°20′44″N 2°15′02″W | | 1184343 | Upload Photo | Q26479666 |
| Railings and Gate to Garden Opposite No 5 | II | St Margaret's Place | | | 23 August 1974 | ST8263760721; 51°20′43″N 2°15′02″W | | 1184347 | Upload Photo | Q26479670 |
| 6 and 7, St Margaret's Street and Archway To Left Of Nos 6 And 7 | II | 6 and 7, St Margaret's Street | | | 23 August 1974 | ST8255060824; 51°20′46″N 2°15′07″W | | 1184372 | 6 and 7, St Margaret's Street and Archway To Left Of Nos 6 And 7 More images | Q26479698 |
| 11, St Margaret's Street | II | 11, St Margaret's Street | | | 18 April 1952 | ST8255260790; 51°20′45″N 2°15′07″W | | 1184381 | 11, St Margaret's Street More images | Q26479706 |
| 45, St Margaret's Street | II | 45, St Margaret's Street | | | 18 April 1952 | ST8252860798; 51°20′46″N 2°15′08″W | | 1184447 | Upload Photo | Q26479771 |
| 48, St Margaret's Street | II | 48, St Margaret's Street | | | 18 April 1952 | ST8252860837; 51°20′47″N 2°15′08″W | | 1184489 | 48, St Margaret's Street More images | Q26479816 |
| Stone Wall with Section of Railings and Gatepiers Running East from South Side of Westbury House | II | St Margaret's Street | | | 23 August 1974 | ST8256060864; 51°20′48″N 2°15′06″W | | 1184513 | Stone Wall with Section of Railings and Gatepiers Running East from South Side of Westbury House More images | Q26479839 |
| 1, Silver Street | II | 1, Silver Street | | | 23 August 1974 | ST8263360952; 51°20′51″N 2°15′03″W | | 1184626 | 1, Silver Street More images | Q26479956 |
| 8 and 9, Silver Street | II | 8 and 9, Silver Street | | | 23 August 1974 | ST8270461016; 51°20′53″N 2°14′59″W | | 1184639 | Upload Photo | Q26479969 |
| 11, Silver Street | II | 11, Silver Street | | | 23 August 1974 | ST8272161031; 51°20′53″N 2°14′58″W | | 1184650 | 11, Silver Street More images | Q26479979 |
| Bunch of Grapes | II | 14, Silver Street | | | 7 November 1963 | ST8274261041; 51°20′53″N 2°14′57″W | | 1184655 | Bunch of Grapes More images | Q26479984 |
| 1, White Hill, 17, Silver Street | II | 1, White Hill | | | 23 August 1974 | ST8278361038; 51°20′53″N 2°14′55″W | | 1184687 | 1, White Hill, 17, Silver Street More images | Q26480015 |
| 20 and 21, Silver Street | II | 20 and 21, Silver Street | | | 23 August 1974 | ST8278161012; 51°20′53″N 2°14′55″W | | 1184705 | 20 and 21, Silver Street More images | Q26480031 |
| 24, Silver Street | II | 24, Silver Street | | | 23 August 1974 | ST8275361023; 51°20′53″N 2°14′56″W | | 1184733 | 24, Silver Street More images | Q26480057 |
| 39, Tory | II | 39, Tory | | | 23 August 1974 | ST8224660924; 51°20′50″N 2°15′23″W | | 1184800 | Upload Photo | Q26480119 |
| Churchyard Gatepiers, Gates And Lamp Bracket To South Of St Mary's Chapel | II | Tory | | | 23 August 1974 | ST8222360888; 51°20′48″N 2°15′24″W | | 1184803 | Upload Photo | Q26480121 |
| 28, White Hill | II | 28, White Hill | | | 23 August 1974 | ST8287761286; 51°21′01″N 2°14′50″W | | 1184840 | Upload Photo | Q26480153 |
| 78, White Hill | II | 78, White Hill | | | 23 August 1974 | ST8279361049; 51°20′54″N 2°14′54″W | | 1184845 | Upload Photo | Q26480157 |
| Wall and Outbuilding Attached to East Side of Manor House | II | Whitehead's Lane | | | 23 August 1974 | ST8278861099; 51°20′55″N 2°14′55″W | | 1184863 | Upload Photo | Q26480174 |
| St Olaves | II* | 19, Woolley Street | | | 18 April 1952 | ST8286460975; 51°20′51″N 2°14′51″W | | 1185137 | St Olaves More images | Q17543542 |
| Gatepiers and Wall at Nos 19 and 21 | II | 19 and 21, Woolley Street | | | 23 August 1974 | ST8287260957; 51°20′51″N 2°14′50″W | | 1185144 | Upload Photo | Q26480457 |
| Weaverhoult | II | 20, Woolley Street | | | 18 April 1952 | ST8316961109; 51°20′56″N 2°14′35″W | | 1185164 | Upload Photo | Q26480476 |
| Upper Bearfield Farmhouse | II | Ashley Road | | | 18 April 1952 | ST8195261706; 51°21′15″N 2°15′38″W | | 1199931 | Upload Photo | Q26495776 |
| Orchard Cottage | II | 3, Barton Orchard | | | 18 April 1952 | ST8222660783; 51°20′45″N 2°15′24″W | | 1199947 | Orchard Cottage More images | Q26495791 |
| Gatepiers and Walls at Maplecroft | II | Bath Road | | | 23 August 1974 | ST8225662297; 51°21′34″N 2°15′22″W | | 1200011 | Upload Photo | Q26495850 |
| Pigeon Cote to South East of No 110 | II | Bath Road | | | 23 August 1974 | ST8235062326; 51°21′35″N 2°15′18″W | | 1200013 | Upload Photo | Q26495851 |
| The Swan Hotel Including Former Shop Adjoining To South | II* | 1, Church Street, BA15 1LN | | | 18 April 1952 | ST8261460991; 51°20′52″N 2°15′04″W | | 1200184 | The Swan Hotel Including Former Shop Adjoining To South More images | Q17543681 |
| Main Block of Abbey Mills | II* | Church Street | | | 18 April 1952 | ST8250160939; 51°20′50″N 2°15′10″W | | 1200197 | Main Block of Abbey Mills More images | Q17543685 |
| Wall to East and North of Vicarage Grounds | II | Church Street | | | 23 August 1974 | ST8239160839; 51°20′47″N 2°15′15″W | | 1200268 | Upload Photo | Q26496084 |
| Orpin's House | II* | 8, Church Street | | | 18 April 1952 | ST8236860881; 51°20′48″N 2°15′16″W | | 1200276 | Orpin's House More images | Q17543703 |
| Outbuilding To The Right Of No 14 | II | 11 and 12, Church Street | | | 7 November 1963 | ST8239760905; 51°20′49″N 2°15′15″W | | 1200310 | Outbuilding To The Right Of No 14 More images | Q26496122 |
| The Dutch Barton | II | 16 and 17, Church Street | | | 7 November 1963 | ST8248260964; 51°20′51″N 2°15′10″W | | 1200312 | The Dutch Barton More images | Q26496124 |
| Druce's Hill House | II* | 22, Church Street | | | 18 April 1952 | ST8248960992; 51°20′52″N 2°15′10″W | | 1200313 | Druce's Hill House More images | Q17543722 |
| Church House | II* | 29, Church Street | | | 18 April 1952 | ST8253361002; 51°20′52″N 2°15′08″W | | 1200315 | Church House More images | Q17543727 |
| 30 Church Street | II | 30, Church Street, BA15 1LN | | | 23 August 1974 | ST8255460997; 51°20′52″N 2°15′07″W | | 1200316 | 30 Church Street More images | Q26496126 |
| 22a, Coppice Hill | II | 22a, Coppice Hill | | | 23 August 1974 | ST8267361053; 51°20′54″N 2°15′01″W | | 1200477 | 22a, Coppice Hill More images | Q26496274 |
| Men's Almhouses Walled Forecourt With Gateway To Nos 1 To 4 | II* | 1-4, Frome Road | | | 18 April 1952 | ST8256860724; 51°20′43″N 2°15′06″W | | 1200482 | Men's Almhouses Walled Forecourt With Gateway To Nos 1 To 4 More images | Q17543740 |
| The Barge Inn | II | Frome Road | | | 23 August 1974 | ST8254960163; 51°20′25″N 2°15′07″W | | 1200524 | The Barge Inn More images | Q26496316 |
| The Hall | I | Holt Road | | | 18 April 1952 | ST8287060899; 51°20′49″N 2°14′50″W | | 1200529 | The Hall More images | Q17529691 |
| 12, Huntingdon Street | II | 12, Huntingdon Street | | | 23 August 1974 | ST8234161466; 51°21′07″N 2°15′18″W | | 1200549 | Upload Photo | Q26496340 |
| Providence Baptist Chapel, Bearfield Buildings | II | Huntingdon Street | | | 23 August 1974 | ST8236461543; 51°21′10″N 2°15′17″W | | 1200552 | Upload Photo | Q26496343 |
| 3, Kingston Road | II* | 3, Kingston Road | | | 18 April 1952 | ST8274060964; 51°20′51″N 2°14′57″W | | 1200601 | 3, Kingston Road More images | Q17543744 |
| 6, Kingston Road | II | 6, Kingston Road | | | 23 August 1974 | ST8286660838; 51°20′47″N 2°14′51″W | | 1200610 | Upload Photo | Q26496395 |
| Garden Walls and Attached Outbuildings and Belenus Shrine to North of Belcombe Court | II | Belcombe Road | | | 12 October 1990 | ST8174860664; 51°20′41″N 2°15′48″W | | 1253042 | Upload Photo | Q26544847 |
| Wall South East of North East Corner of Belcombe Court | II | Belcombe Road | | | 12 October 1990 | ST8176660638; 51°20′40″N 2°15′47″W | | 1253050 | Upload Photo | Q26544855 |
| Statue of Athene Approximately 30 Metres South of Belcombe Court | II | Belcombe Road | | | 12 October 1990 | ST8174360587; 51°20′39″N 2°15′49″W | | 1253053 | Upload Photo | Q26544858 |
| Conduit House And Embanked, Southern Section Of Well Path | II | BA15 1NF | | | 15 November 1990 | ST8225860864; 51°20′48″N 2°15′22″W | | 1253067 | Upload Photo | Q26544872 |
| North Platform Building, Railway Station | II | Railway Station | | | 8 October 1992 | ST8252160679; 51°20′42″N 2°15′08″W | | 1253088 | North Platform Building, Railway Station More images | Q26544891 |
| Mount Pleasant Community Centre | II | Mount Pleasant | | | 28 July 1994 | ST8280161337; 51°21′03″N 2°14′54″W | | 1253100 | Mount Pleasant Community Centre More images | Q26544903 |
| The Round House at Bearfield Buildings | II | Huntingdon Street | | | 10 November 1981 | ST8239761499; 51°21′08″N 2°15′15″W | | 1255548 | Upload Photo | Q26547129 |
| 1, Mount Pleasant | II | 1, Mount Pleasant | | | 28 July 1994 | ST8284261337; 51°21′03″N 2°14′52″W | | 1261943 | 1, Mount Pleasant More images | Q26552851 |
| Gatepiers and Walls to North and West of Leigh House | II | Leigh Road | | | 23 August 1974 | ST8308761941; 51°21′23″N 2°14′39″W | | 1261950 | Upload Photo | Q26552857 |
| Rustic Arch Approximately 330 Metres North West of Belcombe Court | II | Belcombe Road | | | 12 October 1990 | ST8144460819; 51°20′46″N 2°16′04″W | | 1261960 | Upload Photo | Q26552867 |
| Widbrook Bridge, Trowbridge Road | II | Trowbridge Road, Kennet And Avon Canal | | | 15 November 1990 | ST8340159696; 51°20′10″N 2°14′23″W | | 1261986 | Upload Photo | Q26552891 |
| Lodge East South East of Frankleigh House | II | Bath Road | | | 1 February 1996 | ST8232862202; 51°21′31″N 2°15′19″W | | 1268518 | Upload Photo | Q26558824 |
| Gate Piers and Flanking Walls Immediately South East of Lodge East South East of Frankleigh House | II | Bath Road | | | 1 February 1996 | ST8234162201; 51°21′31″N 2°15′18″W | | 1268519 | Upload Photo | Q26558825 |
| Gardeners Cottage East South East of Frankleigh House | II | Bath Road | | | 1 February 1996 | ST8223762247; 51°21′32″N 2°15′23″W | | 1268520 | Upload Photo | Q26558826 |
| 12, Whitehead's Lane | II | 12, Whitehead's Lane | | | 23 August 1974 | ST8275361049; 51°20′54″N 2°14′57″W | | 1299903 | Upload Photo | Q26587255 |
| Well Close Lodge | II | Wine Street | | | 23 August 1974 | ST8216960834; 51°20′47″N 2°15′27″W | | 1299909 | Upload Photo | Q26587260 |
| 12, Wine Street Terrace | II | 12, Wine Street Terrace | | | 23 August 1974 | ST8223060887; 51°20′48″N 2°15′24″W | | 1299911 | Upload Photo | Q26587262 |
| Conigre House | II | Woodleigh Grange Road | | | 23 August 1974 | ST8334461035; 51°20′53″N 2°14′26″W | | 1299919 | Upload Photo | Q26587269 |
| 4 and 5, Whitehead's Lane | II | 4 and 5, Whitehead's Lane | | | 23 August 1974 | ST8275561080; 51°20′55″N 2°14′56″W | | 1299937 | Upload Photo | Q26587285 |
| 4, White Hill | II | 4, White Hill | | | 23 August 1974 | ST8276261042; 51°20′53″N 2°14′56″W | | 1299953 | Upload Photo | Q26587299 |
| Former Primitive Methodist Church | II | Sladesbrook | | | 23 August 1974 | ST8289161370; 51°21′04″N 2°14′49″W | | 1299977 | Former Primitive Methodist Church More images | Q26587321 |
| 7, The Shambles | II | 7, The Shambles | | | 18 April 1952 | ST8265060993; 51°20′52″N 2°15′02″W | | 1300041 | 7, The Shambles More images | Q26587379 |
| 4, The Shambles | II | 4, The Shambles | | | 23 August 1974 | ST8264861011; 51°20′52″N 2°15′02″W | | 1300074 | Upload Photo | Q26587407 |
| Water Gate to North of Westbury House | II | St Margaret's Street | | | 23 August 1974 | ST8253060917; 51°20′49″N 2°15′08″W | | 1300088 | Upload Photo | Q26587421 |
| 14, St Margaret's Street | II | 14, St Margaret's Street | | | 18 April 1952 | ST8256460764; 51°20′44″N 2°15′06″W | | 1300135 | 14, St Margaret's Street More images | Q26587463 |
| Three Gables Restaurant | II | 1 and 2, St Margaret's Street | | | 18 April 1952 | ST8258760857; 51°20′47″N 2°15′05″W | | 1300158 | Three Gables Restaurant More images | Q26587484 |
| 1, St Margaret's Hill | II | 1, St Margaret's Hill | | | 23 August 1974 | ST8258860749; 51°20′44″N 2°15′05″W | | 1300225 | Upload Photo | Q26587546 |
| Marishes | II | 34, St Margaret's Hill | | | 23 August 1974 | ST8264660774; 51°20′45″N 2°15′02″W | | 1300227 | Upload Photo | Q26587548 |
| 3, St Margaret's Place | II | 3, St Margaret's Place | | | 23 August 1974 | ST8262160713; 51°20′43″N 2°15′03″W | | 1300229 | Upload Photo | Q26587550 |
| 10 and 10b, Newtown | II | 10 and 10b, Newtown | | | 18 April 1952 | ST8220060760; 51°20′44″N 2°15′25″W | | 1300257 | 10 and 10b, Newtown More images | Q26587574 |
| 14 and 16, Newtown | II | 14 and 16, Newtown | | | 23 August 1974 | ST8218060764; 51°20′44″N 2°15′26″W | | 1300261 | 14 and 16, Newtown More images | Q26587578 |
| Ramped Path To Right At South End Of Well Path Wall In Front Of Builder's Yard | II | Newtown | | | 23 August 1974 | ST8224960846; 51°20′47″N 2°15′23″W | | 1300264 | Upload Photo | Q26587581 |
| 1, New Road | II | 1, New Road | | | 23 August 1974 | ST8293761339; 51°21′03″N 2°14′47″W | | 1300273 | Upload Photo | Q26587589 |
| 14, Market Street | II | 14, Market Street | | | 23 August 1974 | ST8254561082; 51°20′55″N 2°15′07″W | | 1300347 | 14, Market Street More images | Q26587658 |
| Leigh House Farmhouse and Adjoining Barn | II | Leigh Road | | | 18 April 1952 | ST8293662033; 51°21′26″N 2°14′47″W | | 1300679 | Upload Photo | Q26587966 |
| Garden Seat with Portico in Grounds to West of the Hall | II | Holt Road | | | 23 August 1974 | ST8280160979; 51°20′51″N 2°14′54″W | | 1300720 | Upload Photo | Q26588005 |
| Wall Around The Grounds To North, West And South Of The Hall | II | Holt Road | | | 23 August 1974 | ST8280561003; 51°20′52″N 2°14′54″W | | 1300722 | Upload Photo | Q26588007 |
| 2 Gates With Railings 2 Piers And Walls Around Forecourt To Abbey House | II | Church Street | | | 23 August 1974 | ST8248060950; 51°20′50″N 2°15′11″W | | 1300804 | Upload Photo | Q26588083 |
| 2, 5 and 6, Coppice Hill | II | 2, 5 and 6, Coppice Hill | | | 7 November 1963 | ST8265861033; 51°20′53″N 2°15′01″W | | 1300808 | 2, 5 and 6, Coppice Hill More images | Q26588087 |
| Churchyard Gatepiers and Gates to West of Holy Trinity Church | II | Church Street | | | 23 August 1974 | ST8236060856; 51°20′47″N 2°15′17″W | | 1300860 | Upload Photo | Q26588135 |
| 4 and 5, Church Street | II | 4 and 5, Church Street | | | 18 April 1952 | ST8257660985; 51°20′52″N 2°15′06″W | | 1300865 | 4 and 5, Church Street More images | Q26588140 |
| Belcombe Farmhouse | II | Belcombe Road | | | 23 August 1974 | ST8187060642; 51°20′40″N 2°15′42″W | | 1300948 | Belcombe Farmhouse More images | Q26588220 |
| Bath Road Post Office | II | Bath Road | | | 23 August 1974 | ST8249161598; 51°21′11″N 2°15′10″W | | 1300968 | Upload Photo | Q26588239 |
| Well Close Cottage | II | 1, Belcombe Road | | | 23 August 1974 | ST8215260750; 51°20′44″N 2°15′28″W | | 1300980 | Upload Photo | Q26588250 |
| 10-19, Barton Orchard | II | 10-19, Barton Orchard | | | 18 April 1952 | ST8228160853; 51°20′47″N 2°15′21″W | | 1300987 | 10-19, Barton Orchard More images | Q26588257 |
| 4, Barton Orchard | II | 4, Barton Orchard | | | 29 October 1986 | ST8223060791; 51°20′45″N 2°15′23″W | | 1364448 | 4, Barton Orchard More images | Q26646221 |
| K6 Telephone Kiosk | II | Market Street | | | 31 January 1989 | ST8259361009; 51°20′52″N 2°15′05″W | | 1364449 | K6 Telephone Kiosk More images | Q26686958 |
| Urn Approximately 9 Metres South of Belcombe Court | II | Belcombe Road | | | 12 October 1990 | ST8173960612; 51°20′39″N 2°15′49″W | | 1364450 | Upload Photo | Q26646223 |
| Ha-ha to West of Belcombe Court | II | Belcombe Road | | | 12 October 1990 | ST8168860657; 51°20′41″N 2°15′51″W | | 1364451 | Upload Photo | Q26646224 |
| 10, Silver Street | II | 10, Silver Street | | | 23 August 1974 | ST8271361024; 51°20′53″N 2°14′59″W | | 1364468 | 10, Silver Street More images | Q26646240 |
| 16, Silver Street | II | 16, Silver Street | | | 23 August 1974 | ST8277461033; 51°20′53″N 2°14′55″W | | 1364469 | 16, Silver Street More images | Q26646241 |
| The Old Cottage | II | 19, Silver Street | | | 23 August 1974 | ST8278761007; 51°20′52″N 2°14′55″W | | 1364470 | The Old Cottage More images | Q26646242 |
| 32, Silver Street | II | 32, Silver Street | | | 23 August 1974 | ST8267260982; 51°20′52″N 2°15′01″W | | 1364471 | 32, Silver Street More images | Q26646243 |
| 34 and 35, Silver Street | II | 34 and 35, Silver Street | | | 23 August 1974 | ST8266160970; 51°20′51″N 2°15′01″W | | 1364472 | Upload Photo | Q26646244 |
| Hill House | II | 17, Sladesbrook | | | 23 August 1974 | ST8292761388; 51°21′05″N 2°14′48″W | | 1364473 | Upload Photo | Q26646245 |
| 26-32, Tory | II* | 26-32, Tory | | | 7 November 1963 | ST8226960962; 51°20′51″N 2°15′22″W | | 1364474 | Upload Photo | Q17546623 |
| Churchyard Gatepiers, Gates And Wall To North Of St Mary's Chapel | II | Tory | | | 23 August 1974 | ST8225360923; 51°20′50″N 2°15′22″W | | 1364475 | Upload Photo | Q26646246 |
| Widbrook Farmhouse | II | Trowbridge Road | | | 23 August 1974 | ST8342359260; 51°19′56″N 2°14′22″W | | 1364476 | Upload Photo | Q26646247 |
| 7, White Hill | II | 7, White Hill | | | 23 August 1974 | ST8277761049; 51°20′54″N 2°14′55″W | | 1364477 | 7, White Hill More images | Q26646248 |
| 73, White Hill | II | 73, White Hill | | | 23 August 1974 | ST8281461053; 51°20′54″N 2°14′53″W | | 1364478 | Upload Photo | Q26646249 |
| Dovecote to South of Manor House Forecourt | II | Whitehead's Lane | | | 23 August 1974 | ST8277361087; 51°20′55″N 2°14′55″W | | 1364479 | Upload Photo | Q26646250 |
| Sundial House | II* | 13, Whitehead's Lane | | | 18 April 1952 | ST8275461043; 51°20′54″N 2°14′56″W | | 1364480 | Upload Photo | Q17546627 |
| 4, 6 and 7, Wine Street | II | 4, 6 and 7, Wine Street | | | 23 August 1974 | ST8217360851; 51°20′47″N 2°15′26″W | | 1364481 | Upload Photo | Q26646251 |
| Gothic Gateway Attached to South Side of Nos 12 and 13 | II | Woolley Green | | | 23 August 1974 | ST8376761582; 51°21′11″N 2°14′04″W | | 1364482 | Upload Photo | Q26646252 |
| 3, Woolley Street | II | 3, Woolley Street | | | 23 August 1974 | ST8279961024; 51°20′53″N 2°14′54″W | | 1364483 | 3, Woolley Street More images | Q26646253 |
| 7 and 9, Woolley Street | II | 7 and 9, Woolley Street | | | 23 August 1974 | ST8281761012; 51°20′53″N 2°14′53″W | | 1364484 | 7 and 9, Woolley Street More images | Q26646254 |
| Lynchetts | II* | 15, Woolley Street | | | 18 April 1952 | ST8284961005; 51°20′52″N 2°14′52″W | | 1364485 | Lynchetts More images | Q17546632 |
| The Dower House | II | 21, Woolley Street | | | 23 August 1974 | ST8288860957; 51°20′51″N 2°14′50″W | | 1364486 | Upload Photo | Q26646255 |
| Office Building for Kelly Typesetting | II | 1, Bridge Street | | | 12 July 1986 | ST8305360602; 51°20′39″N 2°14′41″W | | 1364487 | Upload Photo | Q26646256 |
| 6, Newtown | II | 6, Newtown | | | 23 August 1974 | ST8225660842; 51°20′47″N 2°15′22″W | | 1364488 | 6, Newtown More images | Q26646257 |
| Summer House to Rear of No 13 | II | 13, Newtown | | | 23 August 1974 | ST8217560793; 51°20′45″N 2°15′26″W | | 1364489 | Upload Photo | Q26646258 |
| 45 and 46, Newtown | II | 45 and 46, Newtown | | | 23 August 1974 | ST8233660955; 51°20′51″N 2°15′18″W | | 1364490 | 45 and 46, Newtown More images | Q26646259 |
| The Mason's Arms | II | 52, Newtown | | | 23 August 1974 | ST8237060988; 51°20′52″N 2°15′16″W | | 1364491 | The Mason's Arms More images | Q26646260 |
| 60 and 61, Newtown | II | 60 and 61, Newtown | | | 23 August 1974 | ST8240761024; 51°20′53″N 2°15′14″W | | 1364492 | 60 and 61, Newtown More images | Q26646261 |
| Barton Cottage Outbuildings To West Of No 6 | II | 6, Pound Lane | | | 23 August 1974 | ST8240560534; 51°20′37″N 2°15′14″W | | 1364493 | Upload Photo | Q26646262 |
| Barton Bridge | II* | | | | 18 April 1952 | ST8228860532; 51°20′37″N 2°15′20″W | | 1364494 | Barton Bridge More images | Q17546637 |
| 1, St Margaret's Place | II | 1, St Margaret's Place | | | 23 August 1974 | ST8261560706; 51°20′43″N 2°15′04″W | | 1364495 | Upload Photo | Q26646263 |
| Wall Along Street To North Of No 5 | II* | 5, St Margaret's Place | | | 18 April 1952 | ST8263160727; 51°20′43″N 2°15′03″W | | 1364496 | Upload Photo | Q17546644 |
| 10, St Margaret's Place | II | 10, St Margaret's Place | | | 23 August 1974 | ST8265260762; 51°20′44″N 2°15′02″W | | 1364497 | Upload Photo | Q26646264 |
| Small Alcove at North Side of Garden Opposite No 5 | II | St Margaret's Place | | | 23 August 1974 | ST8264160725; 51°20′43″N 2°15′02″W | | 1364498 | Upload Photo | Q26646265 |
| 8 and 9, St Margaret's Street | II | 8 and 9, St Margaret's Street | | | 23 August 1974 | ST8254760812; 51°20′46″N 2°15′07″W | | 1364499 | 8 and 9, St Margaret's Street More images | Q26646266 |
| 21, St Margaret's Street | II | 21, St Margaret's Street | | | 23 August 1974 | ST8260460705; 51°20′43″N 2°15′04″W | | 1364500 | Upload Photo | Q26646267 |
| Garden Wall Of Nos 23 To 26 | II | 23-26, St Margaret's Street | | | 23 August 1974 | ST8263860660; 51°20′41″N 2°15′02″W | | 1364501 | Upload Photo | Q26646268 |
| 44, St Margaret's Street | II | 44, St Margaret's Street | | | 18 April 1952 | ST8253160789; 51°20′45″N 2°15′08″W | | 1364502 | 44, St Margaret's Street More images | Q26646269 |
| St Margaret's | II | St Margaret's Street | | | 18 April 1952 | ST8252660823; 51°20′46″N 2°15′08″W | | 1364503 | St Margaret's More images | Q26646270 |
| Outbuilding to North East of Westbury House | II | St Margaret's Street | | | 18 April 1952 | ST8254460873; 51°20′48″N 2°15′07″W | | 1364504 | Upload Photo | Q26646271 |
| 3, The Shambles | II | 3, The Shambles | | | 23 August 1974 | ST8263961009; 51°20′52″N 2°15′02″W | | 1364505 | Upload Photo | Q26646272 |
| 8, The Shambles | II | 8, The Shambles | | | 18 April 1952 | ST8264560994; 51°20′52″N 2°15′02″W | | 1364506 | 8, The Shambles More images | Q26646273 |
| 7, Silver Street | II | 7, Silver Street | | | 23 August 1974 | ST8269361015; 51°20′53″N 2°15′00″W | | 1364507 | Upload Photo | Q26646274 |
| Wall with 2 Arched Recesses Running East from Holy Trinity Church Hall | II | Church Street | | | 23 August 1974 | ST8252260991; 51°20′52″N 2°15′08″W | | 1364508 | Upload Photo | Q26646275 |
| Midland Bank, Wall And Arches To Left Of Midland Bank | II | Church Street | | | 23 August 1974 | ST8257461005; 51°20′52″N 2°15′06″W | | 1364509 | Midland Bank, Wall And Arches To Left Of Midland Bank More images | Q26646276 |
| 20, Coppice Hill | II | 20, Coppice Hill | | | 18 April 1952 | ST8267661087; 51°20′55″N 2°15′00″W | | 1364510 | 20, Coppice Hill More images | Q26646277 |
| Wall and Gatepiers Running South from the Middle of South Front of Nos 20 and 21 to Join the North Side of No 22a | II | Coppice Hill | | | 23 August 1974 | ST8267561073; 51°20′54″N 2°15′01″W | | 1364511 | Upload Photo | Q26646278 |
| Old Gas Works, Buildings Surrounding The Yard To South (Now Used As The Bradford On Avon Ud Council Depot | II | Frome Road | | | 23 August 1974 | ST8258160378; 51°20′32″N 2°15′05″W | | 1364512 | Upload Photo | Q26646279 |
| The Three Horseshoes Public House | II | Frome Road | | | 23 August 1974 | ST8254760723; 51°20′43″N 2°15′07″W | | 1364513 | The Three Horseshoes Public House More images | Q26646280 |
| Gatepiers and Gates at Main Entrance to North East of the Hall | II | Holt Road | | | 23 August 1974 | ST8293060901; 51°20′49″N 2°14′47″W | | 1364514 | Upload Photo | Q26646281 |
| 6, Huntingdon Street | II | 6, Huntingdon Street | | | 23 August 1974 | ST8235561414; 51°21′05″N 2°15′17″W | | 1364515 | Upload Photo | Q26646282 |
| Bearfield Congregational Chapel | II | Huntingdon Street | | | 23 August 1974 | ST8238961409; 51°21′05″N 2°15′15″W | | 1364516 | Upload Photo | Q26646283 |
| 9, Kingston Road | II | 9, Kingston Road | | | 18 April 1952 | ST8274160924; 51°20′50″N 2°14′57″W | | 1364517 | Upload Photo | Q26646284 |
| Roman Catholic Church of St Thomas More | II | Church Street | | | 23 August 1974 | ST8258961012; 51°20′53″N 2°15′05″W | | 1364518 | Roman Catholic Church of St Thomas More More images | Q7595556 |
| 16 and 17, Market Street | II | 16 and 17, Market Street | | | 23 August 1974 | ST8255761078; 51°20′55″N 2°15′07″W | | 1364519 | 16 and 17, Market Street More images | Q26646286 |
| 27, Market Street | II | 27, Market Street | | | 18 April 1952 | ST8259261048; 51°20′54″N 2°15′05″W | | 1364520 | 27, Market Street More images | Q26646287 |
| 31, Market Street | II | 31, Market Street | | | 7 November 1963 | ST8259961034; 51°20′53″N 2°15′04″W | | 1364521 | 31, Market Street More images | Q26646288 |
| 34, Market Street | II | 34, Market Street | | | 23 August 1974 | ST8261461019; 51°20′53″N 2°15′04″W | | 1364522 | 34, Market Street More images | Q26646289 |
| Thatched Cottage | II | 1, Mason's Lane | | | 23 August 1974 | ST8250961123; 51°20′56″N 2°15′09″W | | 1364523 | Thatched Cottage More images | Q26646290 |
| 8, Mason's Lane | II | 8, Mason's Lane | | | 23 August 1974 | ST8259661142; 51°20′57″N 2°15′05″W | | 1364524 | Upload Photo | Q26646291 |
| 1-18, Middle Rank | II | 1-18, Middle Rank | | | 7 November 1963 | ST8234761008; 51°20′52″N 2°15′17″W | | 1364525 | Upload Photo | Q26646292 |
| 3-13, New Road | II | 3-13, New Road | | | 23 August 1974 | ST8295761329; 51°21′03″N 2°14′46″W | | 1364526 | Upload Photo | Q26646293 |
| The Priory Barn | II* | Newtown | | | 18 April 1952 | ST8247361065; 51°20′54″N 2°15′11″W | | 1364527 | The Priory Barn More images | Q17546649 |
| The Chantry and Little Chantry | II* | Barton Orchard | | | 18 April 1952 | ST8232060845; 51°20′47″N 2°15′19″W | | 1364531 | The Chantry and Little Chantry More images | Q17546653 |
| 7, Barton Orchard | II | 7, Barton Orchard | | | 23 August 1974 | ST8225460824; 51°20′46″N 2°15′22″W | | 1364532 | 7, Barton Orchard More images | Q26646297 |
| Frankleigh House, Including Terrace With Parapets And Piers | II | Bath Road | | | 23 August 1974 | ST8214862278; 51°21′33″N 2°15′28″W | | 1364533 | Upload Photo | Q26646298 |
| 110, Bath Road | II | 110, Bath Road | | | 23 August 1974 | ST8233562351; 51°21′36″N 2°15′18″W | | 1364534 | Upload Photo | Q26646299 |
| 198, Bath Road | II | 198, Bath Road | | | 23 August 1974 | ST8269361386; 51°21′05″N 2°15′00″W | | 1364535 | Upload Photo | Q26646300 |
| 19-23, Bridge Street | II | 19-23, Bridge Street | | | 23 August 1974 | ST8262860846; 51°20′47″N 2°15′03″W | | 1364536 | 19-23, Bridge Street More images | Q26646301 |
| Manbridge Restaurant | II | 25, Bridge Street | | | 18 April 1952 | ST8259760855; 51°20′47″N 2°15′05″W | | 1364537 | Manbridge Restaurant More images | Q26646302 |
| Budbury House | II | Budbury Place | | | 30 August 1972 | ST8227361028; 51°20′53″N 2°15′21″W | | 1364538 | Upload Photo | Q26646303 |
| 6, Church Street | II | 6, Church Street | | | 18 April 1952 | ST8256960982; 51°20′52″N 2°15′06″W | | 1364539 | 6, Church Street More images | Q26646304 |
| Holy Trinity Church | I | Church Street | | | 18 April 1952 | ST8241260878; 51°20′48″N 2°15′14″W | | 1364540 | Holy Trinity Church More images | Q17530097 |
| Vicarage | II | 7, Church Street | | | 23 August 1974 | ST8236960829; 51°20′47″N 2°15′16″W | | 1364541 | Vicarage More images | Q26646305 |
| 10, Church Street | II | 10, Church Street | | | 7 November 1963 | ST8238860893; 51°20′49″N 2°15′15″W | | 1364542 | 10, Church Street More images | Q26646306 |
| Abbey House, Annexe To Rear Of Abbey House | II* | Church Street | | | 18 April 1952 | ST8245960941; 51°20′50″N 2°15′12″W | | 1364543 | Abbey House, Annexe To Rear Of Abbey House More images | Q17546658 |
| 19-21, Church Street | II | 19-21, Church Street | | | 18 April 1952 | ST8247860983; 51°20′52″N 2°15′11″W | | 1364544 | 19-21, Church Street More images | Q26646307 |
| New Mills (Buildings 72-75), Kingston Mills | II | Kingston Mills | | | 28 June 2005 | ST8269860948; 51°20′50″N 2°14′59″W | | 1391651 | Upload Photo | Q26671004 |
| Former Rubber Store (Building 76), Kingston Mills | II | Kingston Mills | | | 28 June 2005 | ST8270360973; 51°20′51″N 2°14′59″W | | 1391652 | Former Rubber Store (Building 76), Kingston Mills More images | Q26671005 |
| Bradford On Avon Rowing Club War Memorial | II | | | | 2 August 2017 | ST8219160507; 51°20′36″N 2°15′25″W | | 1447493 | Upload Photo | Q66478830 |
| Milestone, Approximately 150M North-West Of Widbrook Bridge, Trowbridge Road A363 | II | Trowbridge Road | | | 6 December 2022 | ST8333559833; 51°20′14″N 2°14′26″W | | 1483447 | Upload Photo | Q111790256 |

== See also ==
- Grade I listed buildings in Wiltshire
- Grade II* listed buildings in Wiltshire

== Sources ==
- Orbach, Julian; Pevsner, Nikolaus; Cherry, Bridget (2021), Wiltshire, The Buildings of England, New Haven and London: Yale University Press, ISBN 978-0-300-25120-3
