= Holy Trinity Church, Bradford-on-Avon =

Coordinates: 51.3467°N 2.2539°W

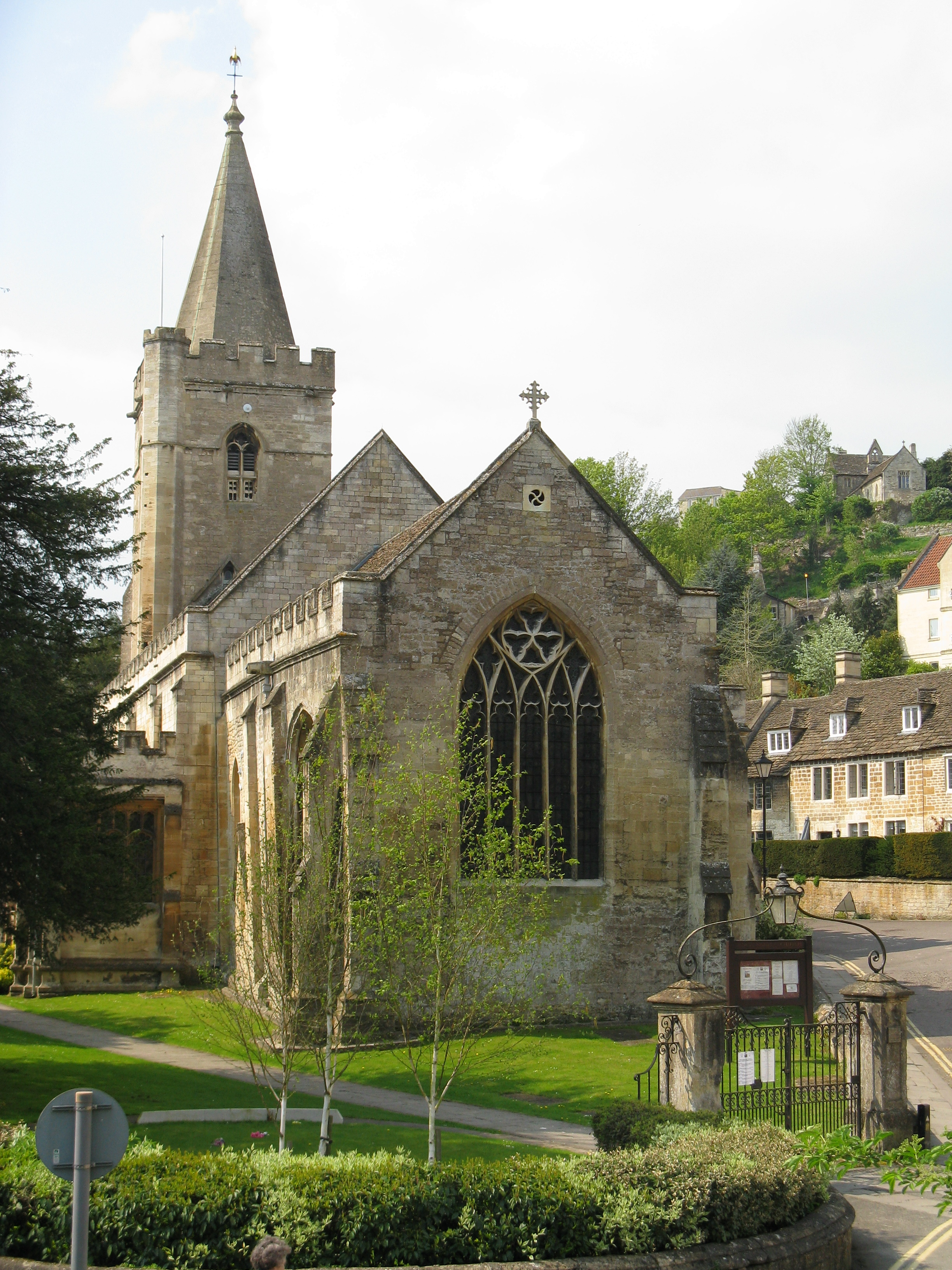
- Holy Trinity Church, Bradford-on-Avon
- OS grid reference: ST 82412 60878
- Country: England
- Denomination: Church of England
- Website: htboa.org

History
- Founded: 1150

Architecture
- Functional status: Active
- Heritage designation: Grade I Listed building
- Style: Norman architecture

Holy Trinity Church, Bradford-on-Avon is a Grade I listed church in Bradford-on-Avon, Wiltshire, England, with 12th-century origins. It is part of the Church of England within the Anglican Communion and Diocese of Salisbury.

== History ==
The present church was built around 1150 and originally consisted of a chancel and nave. The chancel was lengthened around the beginning of the 13th century, and a section of the south-east wall rebuilt in 1707. In 2016, the sale of a Flemish masterpiece by Quentin Matsys funded a £2m refurbishment of the church, which swept away the then 150-year-old pews and other fittings by Bath architect John Elkington Gill, to cater for changes in taste. A squint near the altar is claimed to be England's longest. The tower with spire was built around 1480, replacing an older one, and the south wall was largely rebuilt in the 19th century. The church has a ring of eight bells, with the tenor (heaviest bell) weighing 29 long cwt 2 qr 26 lb (3,330 lb or 1,510 kg).

The building was designated as Grade I listed in 1952. The parish of Holy Trinity has been a part of the benefice of Bradford on Avon Holy Trinity, Westwood and Wingfield since 2013.

== Leadership ==
As of 2024, the rector is Jennifer Louise Nelson.

Previous leaders include:

- 2013–2024 Joanna Abecassis
- 1981–2010 William Andrew Matthews, Chaplain to the Queen
- 1973-1981 David Caldwell Ritche
- 1965–1973 David Inderwick Strangeways
- 1956–1965 Arthur Frederick Osborne
- 1944–1956 Claude Stanley Green
- 1937–1944 Philip Maurice Barry
