= The Hall, Bradford-on-Avon =

Mansion in Wiltshire dating from the 1600s

Coordinates: 51.3469°N 2.24734°W

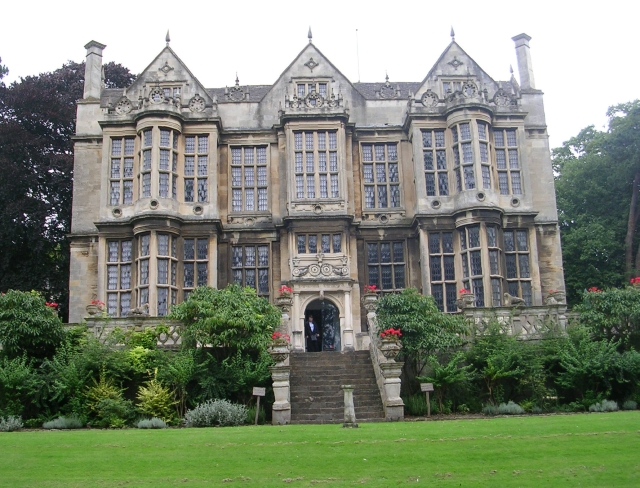
The Hall, south front

The Hall, at times known as Kingston House and The Duke's House, is a Grade I listed Jacobean mansion in Bradford-on-Avon, Wiltshire, England.

== History ==
The Hall was built around 1610 for John Hall, a wealthy mill owner, and is at the east end of the town. The Hall family of Bradford can be traced back to at least the 13th century, under the name of "De Aulâ" or "De la Sale" (salle being French for hall). John Hall's grandson, also named John Hall, had no legitimate children and left his estate to his great-niece Rachel Baynton. She later married William Pierrepont, who became Duke of Kingston-upon-Hull, giving the house its alternate names. After the second Duke died without issue, the house was sold to Thomas Divett, in 1802, who established a woollen mill, and sublet the house, which fell into disrepair. In 1848, the house was sold to Stephen Moulton, who undertook major restorations. During the restoration, many old documents were discovered, which were catalogued by Canon J.E.Jackson.

== Architecture ==
The Hall, in particular the south front, is notable for having "more glass than wall". Not all contemporaries approved of the style. Francis Bacon in On Building refers to "fair houses so full of glass that one cannot tell where to become to be out of the sun or cold". The architect is not known. Similarities of style to Longleat, not far away and built about 30 years earlier, have led to suggestions that Robert Smythson may have been involved in the design.

The building sits high on a terrace. The south front has three projecting bays of two stories, with gables above. The outer two bays are wider than the central one, and have semi-circular projections. Open rings above the bays form a kind of balustrade. The terrace has a balustrade with a central staircase, leading to the main doorway of the house, which has a round arch, flanking Tuscan columns, and scroll-work above. Inside, the ceilings are high, and there are a number of Jacobean chimney-pieces and moulded plaster ceilings.

== Gardens ==
The house stands in grounds of some 3.5 acres (1.4 ha), which were landscaped in the mid-19th century and recorded at Grade II on the National Register of Historic Parks and Gardens in 1987. John Moulton, the younger son of Stephen Moulton who inherited the estate in 1894, carried out extensive improvements and added many plants and trees. Further improvements were made from the 1960s by John's grandson Alex Moulton, who used the north-east corner of the site for his Moulton bicycle works.

The landscaping is in several sections. Just east of the house, a square lawn is surrounded by a clipped yew hedge. To the west, a path across another lawn leads to a small stone temple, probably 19th-century, having a triangular pediment supported by two Doric columns. South of the house is a large Grade II* listed balustraded terrace with 18th-century stonework, added to in the 19th century. In the far south is an octagonal building in rubble stone, from the late 18th century or early 19th; originally a dovecote, it was later an entrance lodge and is now a dwelling. The eastern parts of the grounds are informal pleasure gardens, with stables (created from a barn by Harold Brakspear in 1901–02) and a paddock; here is another small temple, probably from the 18th century, with four Tuscan columns.

== Gallery ==
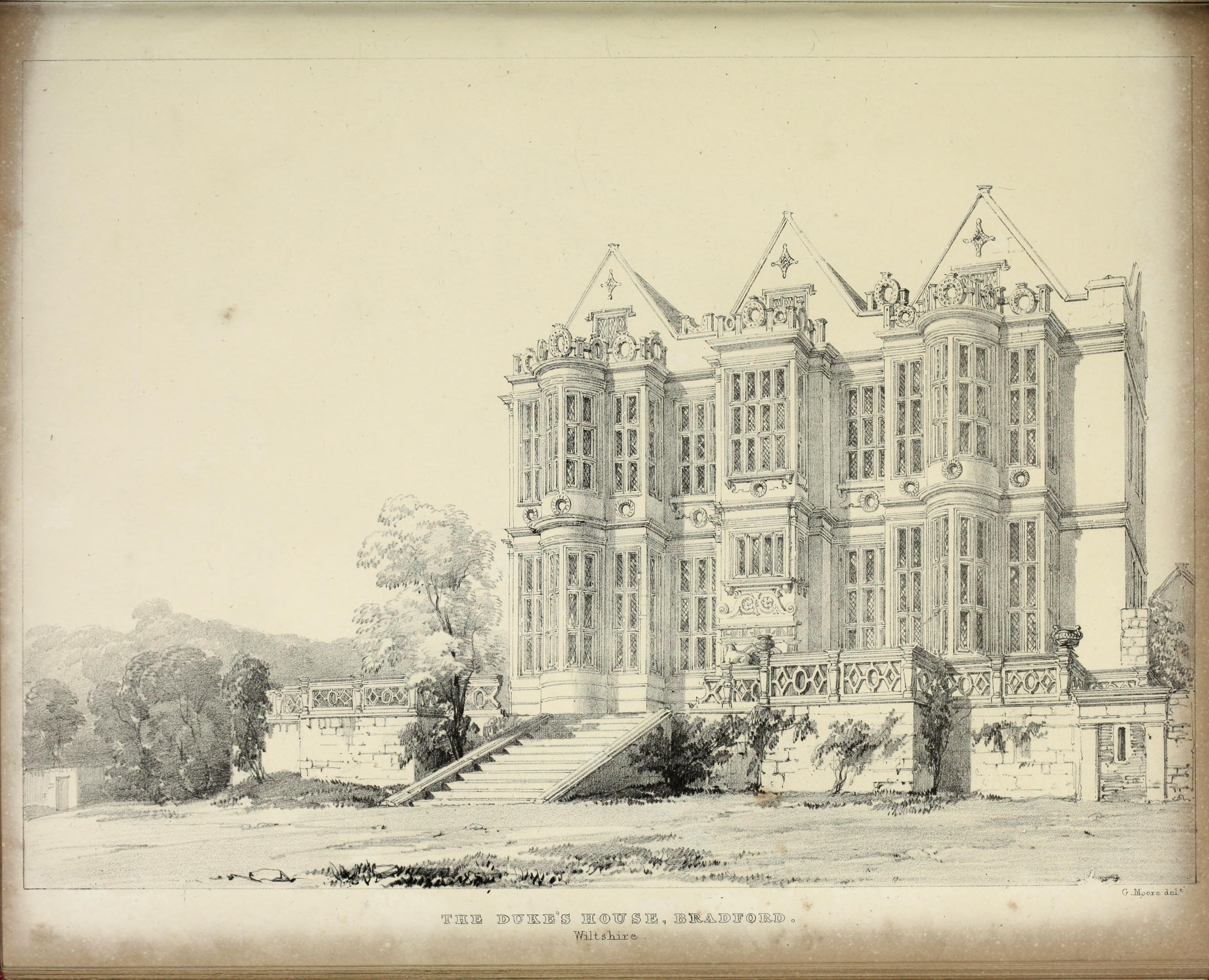
View of The Hall, by C.J. Richardson, published in 1837, so before the restoration in 1850

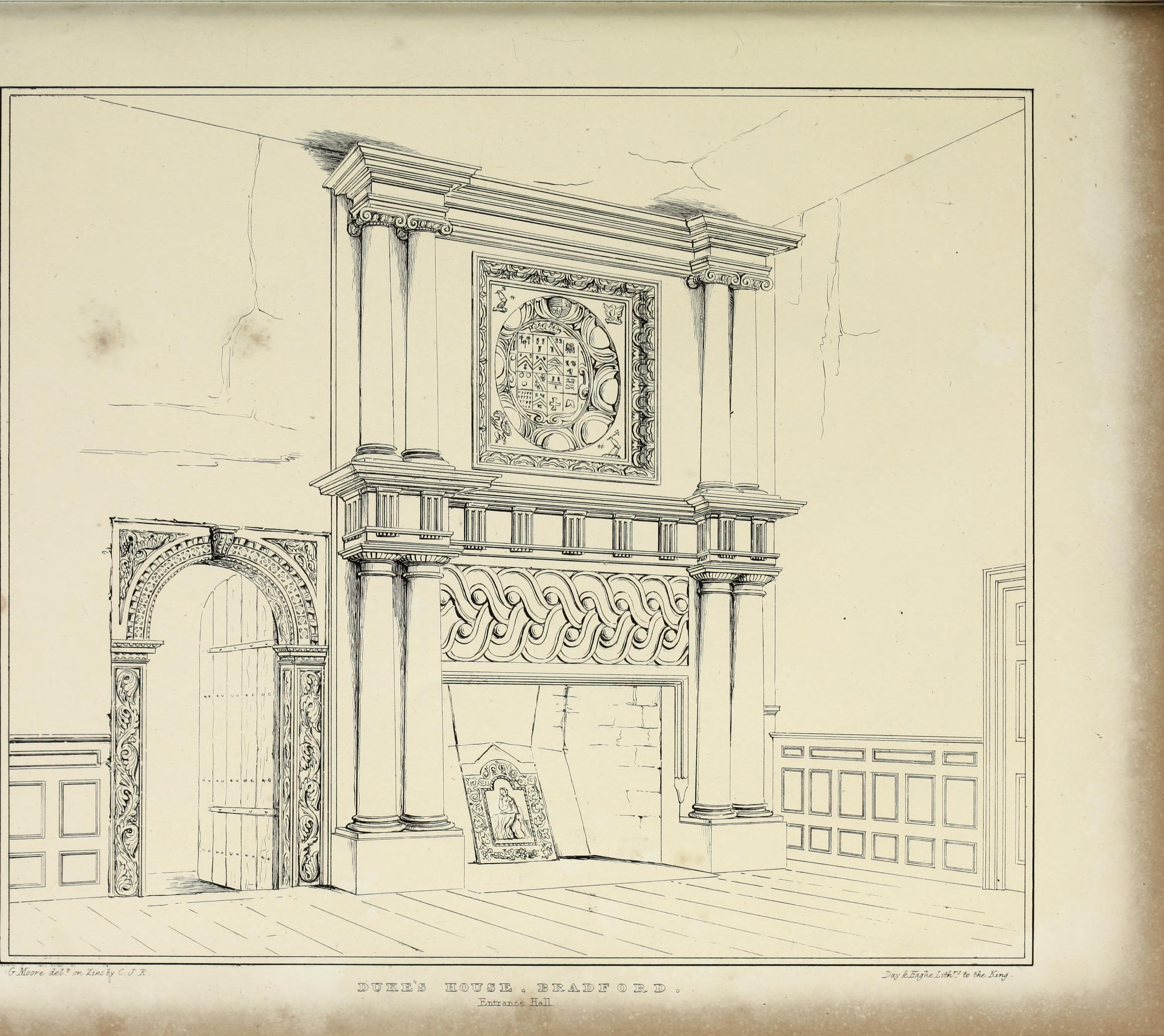
Drawing of chimney-piece and doorway by Richardson

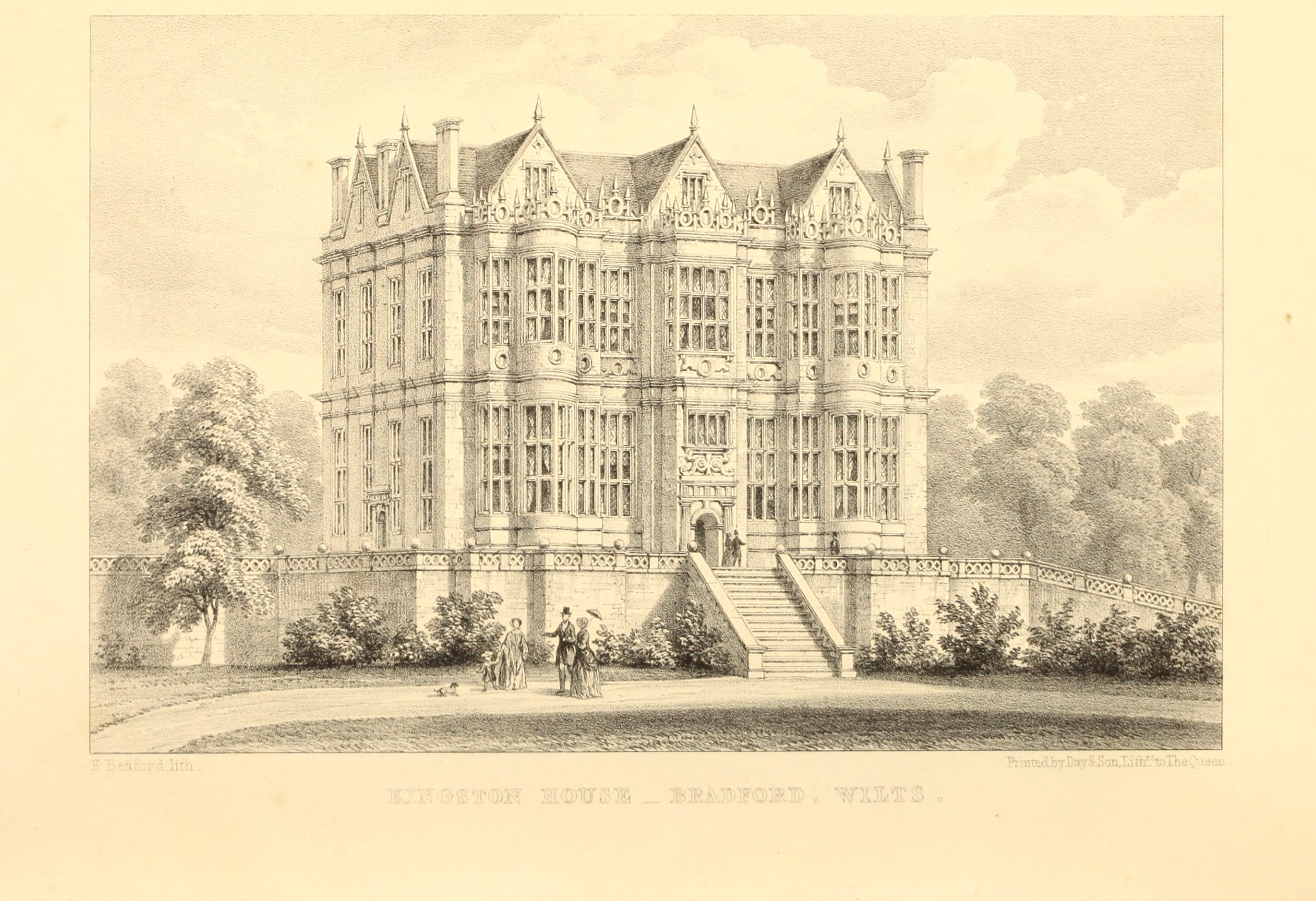
Engraving of the Hall, 1854

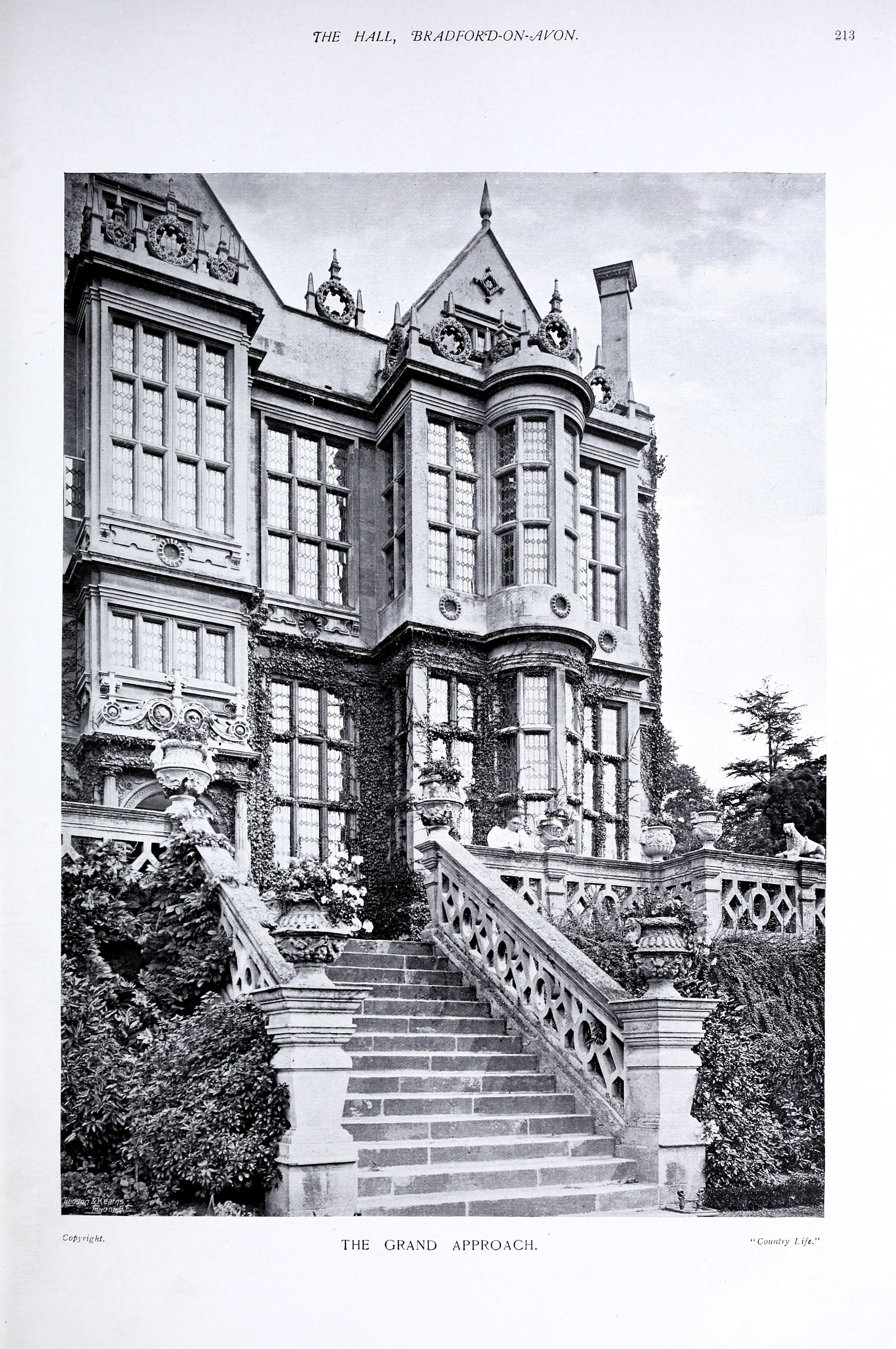
The stairway to the terrace, photographed by Charles Latham in the late 1890s

== Assessment ==
The Hall has been highly regarded from its early days to the present. John Aubrey (1670) described it as "the best built house for the quality of a gentleman in Wiltshire". W. J. Loftie in 1893 called it the most perfect of the smaller houses in the "second Elizabethan" style. The house was selected as the model for the pavilion which was built for the 1900 Exhibition in Paris.

The house was designated as Grade I listed in 1954. Pevsner and Cherry (1975) refer to it as of national importance.

== Present day ==
After the death in 2012 of Alex Moulton, great-grandson of Stephen Moulton, under the terms of his will the house – along with investments, land, outbuildings and cottages – was gifted to a charitable trust. In 2020 the trust was reorganised as a charitable incorporated organisation, the Alex Moulton Charitable Trust, which continues to preserve and maintain the Hall and its collections, and promote engineering and design. The trust runs occasional tours of the building and holds events in the grounds.
