= Paddy Edwards =

English cricketer (born 1965)

Personal information
- Full name: Patrick Gervase Edwards
- Born: 21 October 1965 (age 61); Bradford-on-Avon, Wiltshire, England
- Batting: Right-handed
- Bowling: Slow left-arm orthodox

Domestic team information
- Years: Team
- 1987–1989: Oxford University

Career statistics
Competition	First-class
Matches	19
Runs scored	83
Batting average	8.30
100s/50s	–/–
Top score	10*
Balls bowled	3,185
Wickets	40
Bowling average	43.15
5 wickets in innings	–
10 wickets in match	–
Best bowling	4/93
Catches/stumpings	6/–
- Source: Cricinfo, 1 March 2020

Patrick Gervase Edwards (born 21 October 1965) is an English former first-class cricketer.

Edwards was born at Bradford-on-Avon in October 1965. He later studied at Christ Church, Oxford where he played first-class cricket for Oxford University. He made his debut against Kent at Oxford in 1987. He played first-class cricket for Oxford until 1989, making a total of nineteen appearances. Playing as a slow left-arm orthodox bowler, he took 40 wickets at an average of 43.15 and best figures of 4 for 93.
