= Stephen Moulton =

British businessman in the rubber industry

- Born: July 7, 1794; Whorlton, County Durham, England
- Died: April 26, 1880 (aged 85)
- Occupation: Businessman
- Known for: Rubber industry pioneer who first brought samples of vulcanized rubber to the United Kingdom
- Relatives: Dr Alex Moulton (grandson)

Stephen Moulton (7 July 1794 – 26 April 1880) was an Englishman who, as an agent of the American rubber pioneer Charles Goodyear, first brought samples of vulcanized rubber to the United Kingdom.

== Early life ==
Moulton, who was born in Whorlton, County Durham, subsequently shared the samples with Thomas Hancock, who then beat Goodyear to a UK patent for the vulcanization process by a matter of a few weeks in 1843.

== Career ==
After various disputes with Hancock and Goodyear over patents and manufacturing rights, Moulton established his own factory in 1848 at Kingston Mill near Bradford-on-Avon, Wiltshire, England. His company, S.Moulton & Co., specialised in rubber applications for engineering industries and in 1855 acquired the Middle Mill adjacent to the existing factory along with the nearby Staverton woollen mill between 1851 and 1860. With the increasing importance of the British railway industry he concentrated on providing rubber suspension systems and components for railway carriages. Moulton's home in Bradford was The Hall, a Jacobean mansion on the eastern edge of the town.

In 1891, eleven years after Moulton's death, his company amalgamated with that of George Spencer in London to become George Spencer Moulton & Co. Ltd., which in 1956 became part of Avon Rubber.

== Family connection ==
Moulton's great-grandson Dr Alex Moulton was himself a pioneer of rubber engineering, being responsible for many innovations including the rubber suspension system he designed for the innovative BMC car, the Mini.
