= Chapel of St Mary Tory =

Chapel in Wiltshire, England

Coordinates: 51.3469°N 2.2563°W

St Mary's Chapel, Tory
- The chapel and its attached house
- St Mary's Chapel, Tory
- OS grid reference: ST 82241 60899
- Location: Bradford on Avon, Wiltshire
- Country: England

History
- Status: Active
- Dedication: Mary, mother of Jesus

Architecture
- Heritage designation: Grade II listed
- Designated: 18 April 1952 (#1036140)
- Style: Gothic
- Years built: Late 15th century (restored 1877)

The Chapel of St Mary Tory is a small, late-medieval chapel in Bradford on Avon in Wiltshire, England. It is in the area known as Tory, at the western end of the uppermost terrace on the hillside, overlooking the town and the River Avon below. The chapel is managed by the Saxon Church Trustees (a local ecumenical charity who also own the nearby St Laurence's Church) and continues to be used for worship.

== History ==
Although its origins are unclear, the present structure at St Mary Tory was probably built during the late 15th century as a chapel for pilgrims travelling between Glastonbury and Malmesbury. The chapel is attached to a house and is sometimes referred to as a hermitage, as a cell in the hillside below is thought to have belonged to a local hermit. St Mary Tory was recorded in John Leland's Itinerary (c. 1540) and later visited by John Aubrey in the 17th century, who praised the chapel's construction and number of rooms in the hermitage, and commented on the quality of its hillside as a place for growing vines. Aubrey also called it the "finest hermitage I have seen in England".

For centuries, the chapel was the only building on top of the hill. It was only in the late 17th century that the hillside began to be developed into a series of terraced houses, which were eventually built all the way up to the chapel. The name 'Tory', also referring to the highest terrace of the neighbourhood, is said to be derived from tor, which in turn comes from the Old English torr, meaning 'prominent hill'. This is common in place names in the South West of England, as in Glastonbury Tor.

By the 19th century the chapel was in ruins, and it was restored by its owner T. B. Saunders in 1877. St Mary Tory was designated a Grade II listed building in 1952, and new stained glass was made for the east window by the artist Mark Angus in 1999. Most of the original late-medieval stonework that survives today can be found in the chapel's east wall, including the Perpendicular Gothic east window and one of the two canopied niches flanking it.

== Gallery ==
East end of the chapel, overlooking the Bradford Tithe Barn in the distance

Interior, with the east window and niches
