= Suzuki FZ50 =

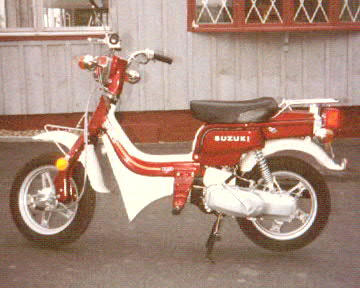
- Suzuki FZ50
- Manufacturer: Suzuki
- Production: 1978–1983
- Class: scooter
- Engine: 49 cc (3.0 cu in), air-cooled, two-stroke, single
- Bore / stroke: 41mm bore 37.4mm stroke
- Compression ratio: 6.5:1
- Top speed: 30 miles per hour
- Power: 3.2 horsepower stock engine power
- Transmission: Two-speed automatic
- Frame type: Step-through frame
- Suspension: Rear: Swingarm
- Brakes: Drum front and rear

The Suzuki FZ50 was a step-through commuter moped, described by a Motor Cycle News road tester in 1979 as "the most attractive moped I've seen and must take the run-about class into a new area of perfection" with "sporty alloy spoked wheels" but having small, "ineffective" legshields with footpegs, not footboards.

Produced by Suzuki, it was known by the nickname "Suzy" in UK, but in other markets as Youdy and Rascal. It was also advertised as the FS50 in other countries. It had a 49 cc (3.0 cu in) two-stroke pivoted engine integral with the transmission, and a coil-over damper mounted to the single-sided swinging arm enclosing the chain final drive.

The FZ50 was restricted to 30 miles per hour to adhere to the existing moped regulations. However, most go over 30 miles per hour with no modifications.

With a two-speed automatic transmission utilizing two centrifugal clutches, the engine used Suzuki's CCI oil-injection lubrication system with underseat separate fuel and oil tanks, a fuel gauge and front and rear carriers. The FZ50 piston, cylinder, head, and exhaust are interchangeable with the Suzuki FA50.

Unlike most scooters, the FZ50 is a "noped", a moped lacking pedals. It instead uses a left-side-mounted engine kick-start, normally found on larger machines, with a lock-out operated by the handlebar-mounted rear brake lever.
