= Bicycle fender =

Bicycle component enclosing a tire

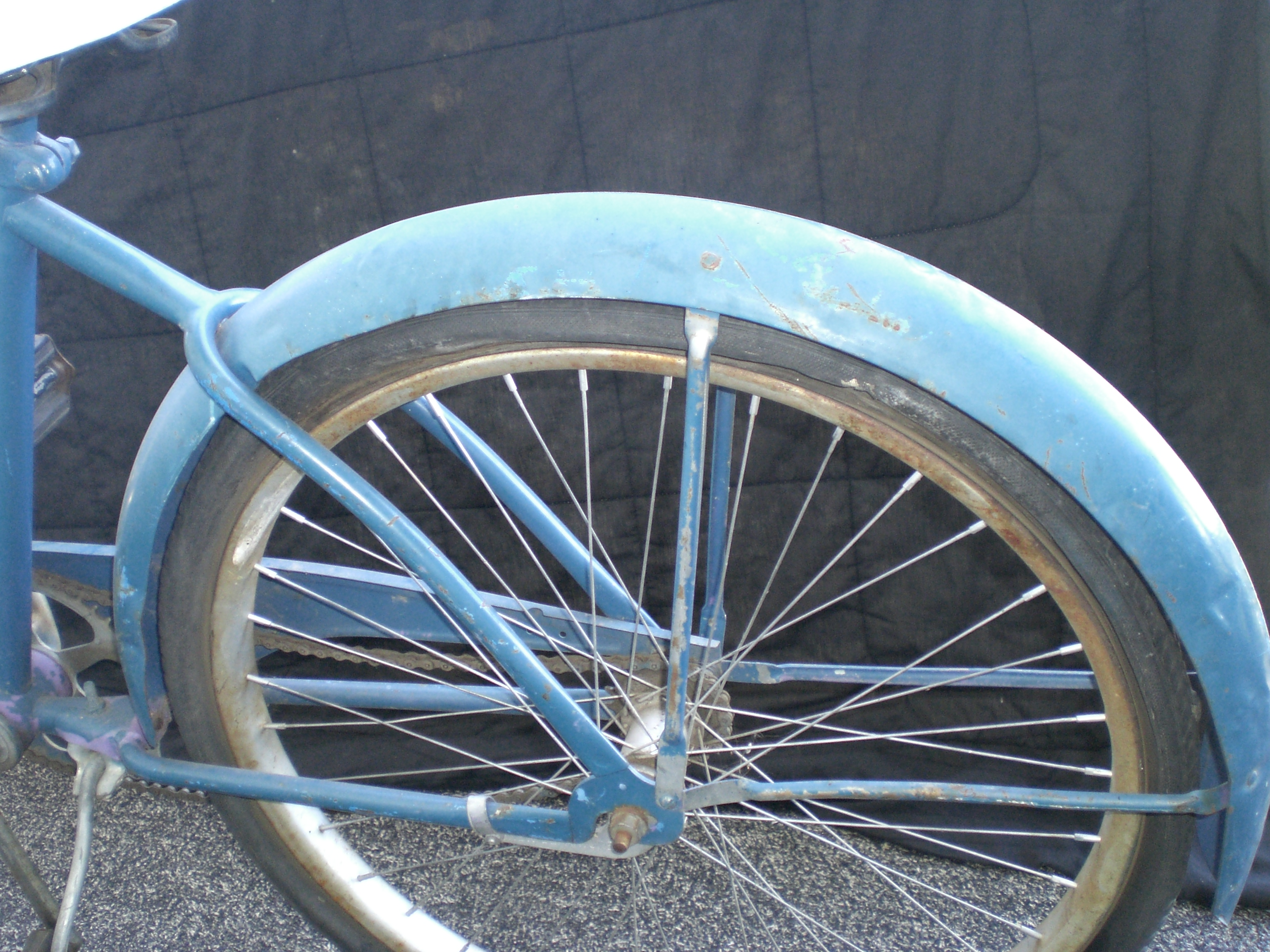
Full-covering rear fender on a bicycle

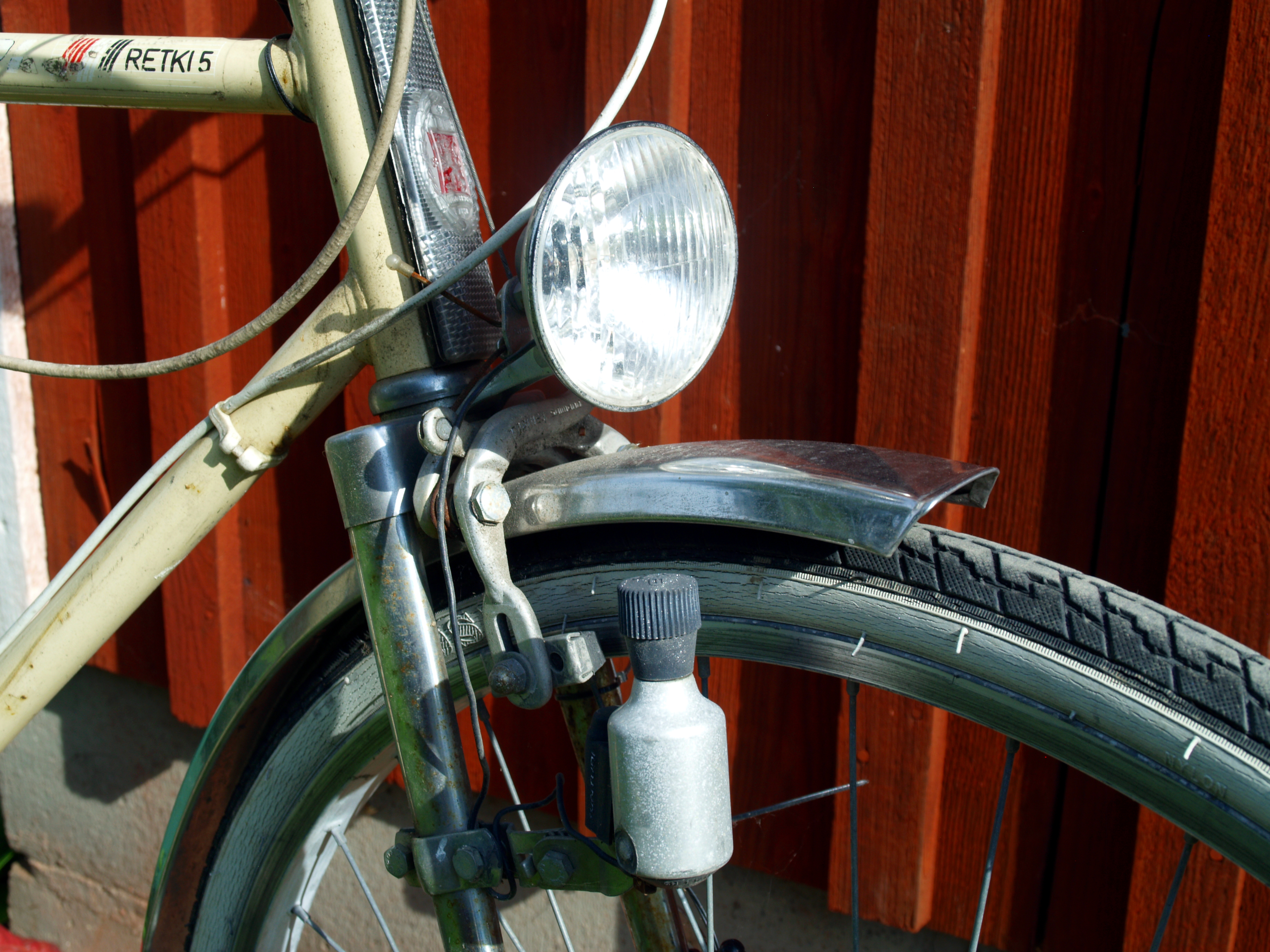
Partially covering front fender on a bicycle

On a bicycle, a fender American English or mudguard British English is a part that encloses a tire so that it stops spray of water, sand, mud, stones and other road debris from thrown into the air by the rotating wheel. Full-covering fenders go over most of the upper side of the tire, and are considered standard equipment on utility bikes. Sports bikes can have smaller fenders or be completely fenderless, especially on bikes made for use in drier climates.

Fenders (mudguards) have an additional cost and contributes to extra weight on the bike, but have the benefits of keeping the cyclist's legs, trousers and back drier, as well as preventing paint damage, preventing eye damage to passengers in bicycle trailers, and being able to provide lower aerodynamic drag. The spray can be clearly noticed when cycling behind another rider in wet conditions, such as when cycling in pelotons, and some clubs require the use of a rear fenders when training in the winter.

To mount fenders, there must be enough clearance between the wheels and the fork and frame, and the choice of tires also has an impact on how much space there is for fenders. There are no standards for fenders, but there are adjustable models on the market that can be adapted to fit several bikes. Some bikes have eyelets on the frame and fork for securely attaching fenders, or manufacturers make some which attach to the bicycle with e.g. rubber bands. Alternatively, some rear fenders can be fitted to the seatpost.

== See also ==
- Skirt guard
- Fender skirts
- Mudflap
