= Step-through frame =

Type of bicycle frame

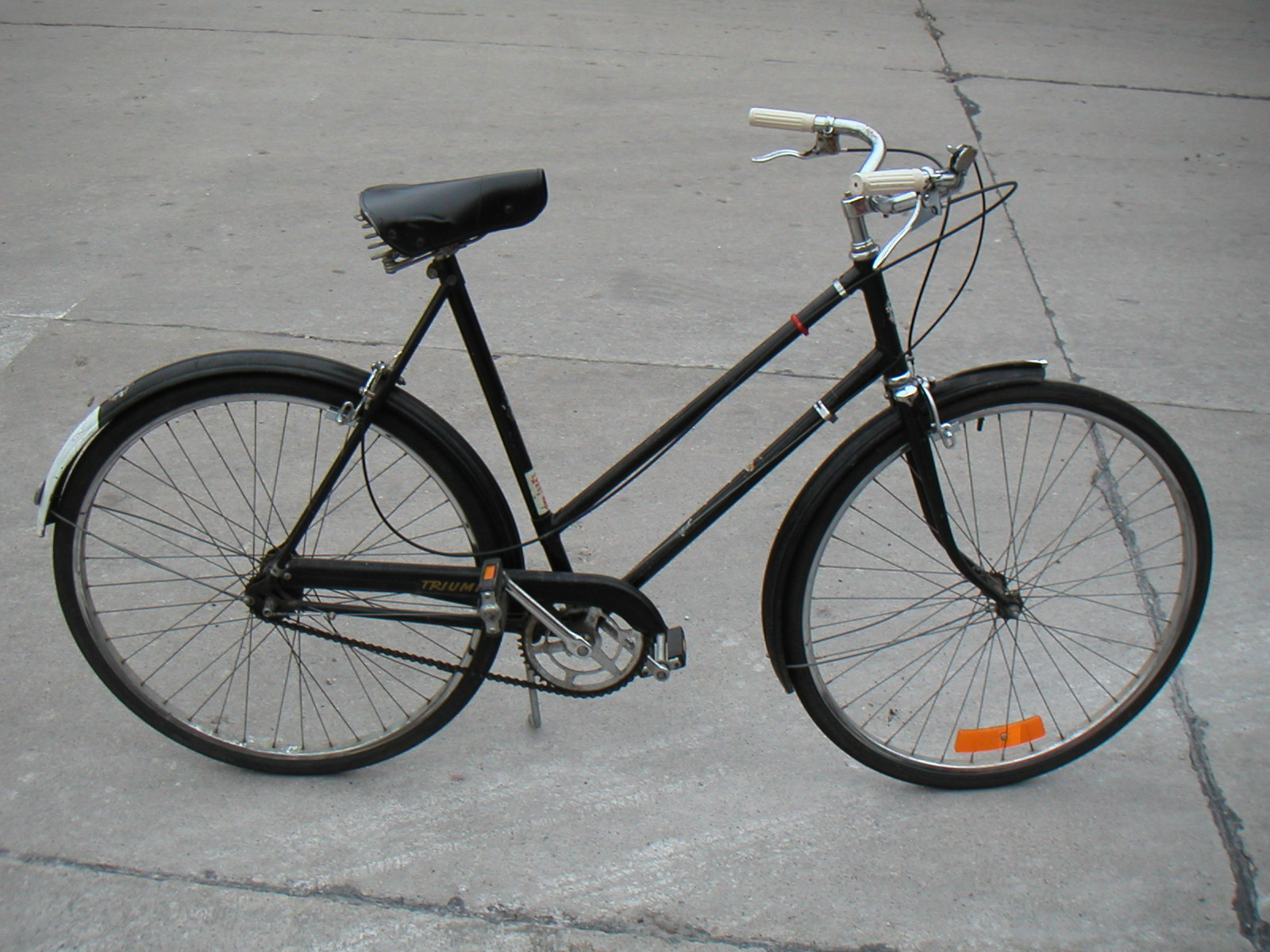
A Triumph with a step-through frame

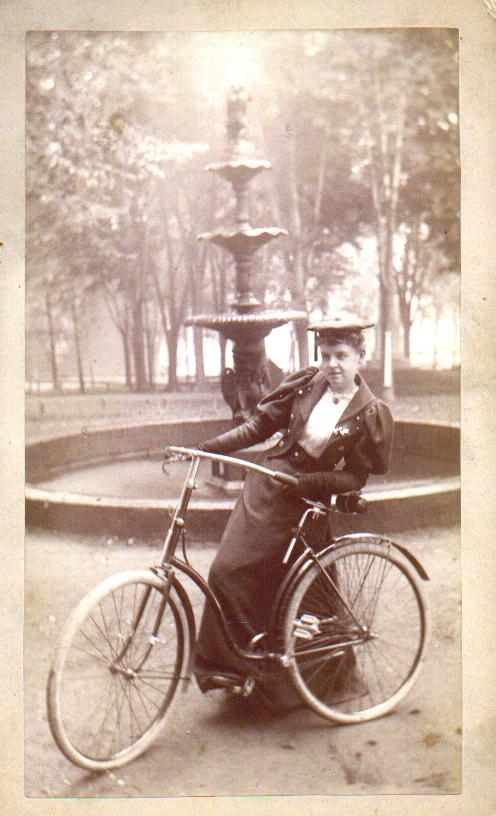
Woman with a step-through frame bicycle in the 1890s

A step-through frame (also known as open frame, drop frame, low-step frame) is a type of bicycle frame, often used for utility bicycles, with a low or absent top tube or cross-bar.

Since mounting or dismounting a step-through does not require swinging one leg to hip-height, they are widely used as delivery bicycles, and for other purposes where the rider has to mount and dismount frequently.

Traditionally, bicycles with a step-through frame were known as "ladies'", "women's" or "girls' bicycles", as they allow skirts or dresses to hang fairly normally. Bicycles with a high top tube (cross-bar), were known as "men's", "gents'", or "boys' bicycles". Even in the 1800s, women often rode "men's" bicycles and vice-versa; from the 1890s onwards, women commonly wore bloomers to cycle. Since the late 20th century, descriptions that describe the frame style, rather than the presumed gender of the rider, are becoming increasingly common.

== Advantages ==
- less risk of stretching or ripping clothes when mounting the saddle
- the rider can wear a skirt, kilt, or dress (longer garments may also require a skirt guard and possibly a chain guard)
- very quick to mount and dismount, suitable for delivery bicycles, or any journey with many stops
- potentially safer; a rider who loses balance can step through the bicycle without becoming entangled or hitting their crotch
- suitable for elderly and others with restricted agility
- easier to share with shorter friends and family
- compactness provides a popular starting point for folding bicycles.

== Disadvantages ==
- 1892 ad showing a step-through and step-over model
  Heavier. Compared to a traditional diamond frame consisting of two near-triangles, open or step-through frame designs must be designed with thicker gauge tubing, the use of additional gusseting members, and/or monocoque frame construction. These structural elements may add weight or cost over a traditional diamond design.
- Inattention to structural design can lead to excessive flexing, resulting in lower pedaling efficiency and reduced frame life.
- Fewer places to mount accessories, e.g. an air pump or water-bottle.
- More difficult to carry around off the ground due to the sloping tube near the bicycle's center of gravity, e.g. carrying it up stairs, or lifting to hang it for maintenance.

== Variations ==
=== Mixte ===
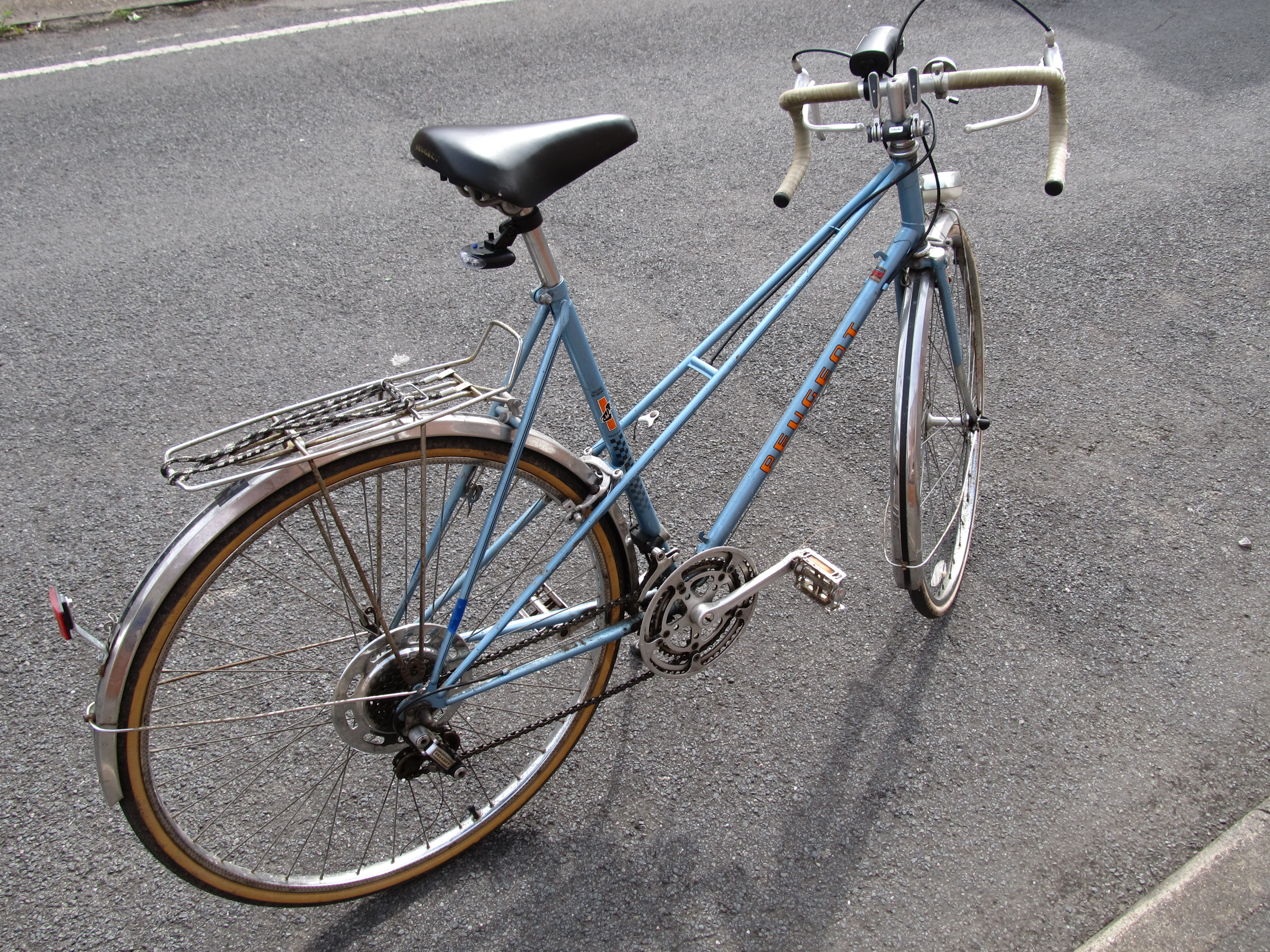
A Peugeot mixte frame bicycle

One particular type of step-through frame is called a mixte. In a mixte frame, the top tube of the traditional diamond frame is replaced with a pair of smaller tubes (lateral tubes, or lats) running from the top of the head tube all the way back to the rear axle, connecting at the seat tube on the way. The normal seat stays and chain stays are retained. This provides the lower standover height of a step-through frame bicycle with a strong diamond-frame geometry.

Mixte (pronounced [mikst]) is a direct appropriation of the French word meaning "mixed" or "unisex". The usual North American bicycle industry pronunciation of this loan word is /ˈmɪkstiː/.

A variant on the mixte uses a single, full sized top tube running from the upper head tube to the seat tube, but retains the middle set of stays. The FNCRM (Fédération Nationale du Commerce et de la Réparation du Cycle et du Motocycle) calls this style a sport.

Other named French styles of step-through frames, in addition to mixte and sport, include berceau, Anglais, jumele, col de cygne and double col de cygne.

=== Cross ===
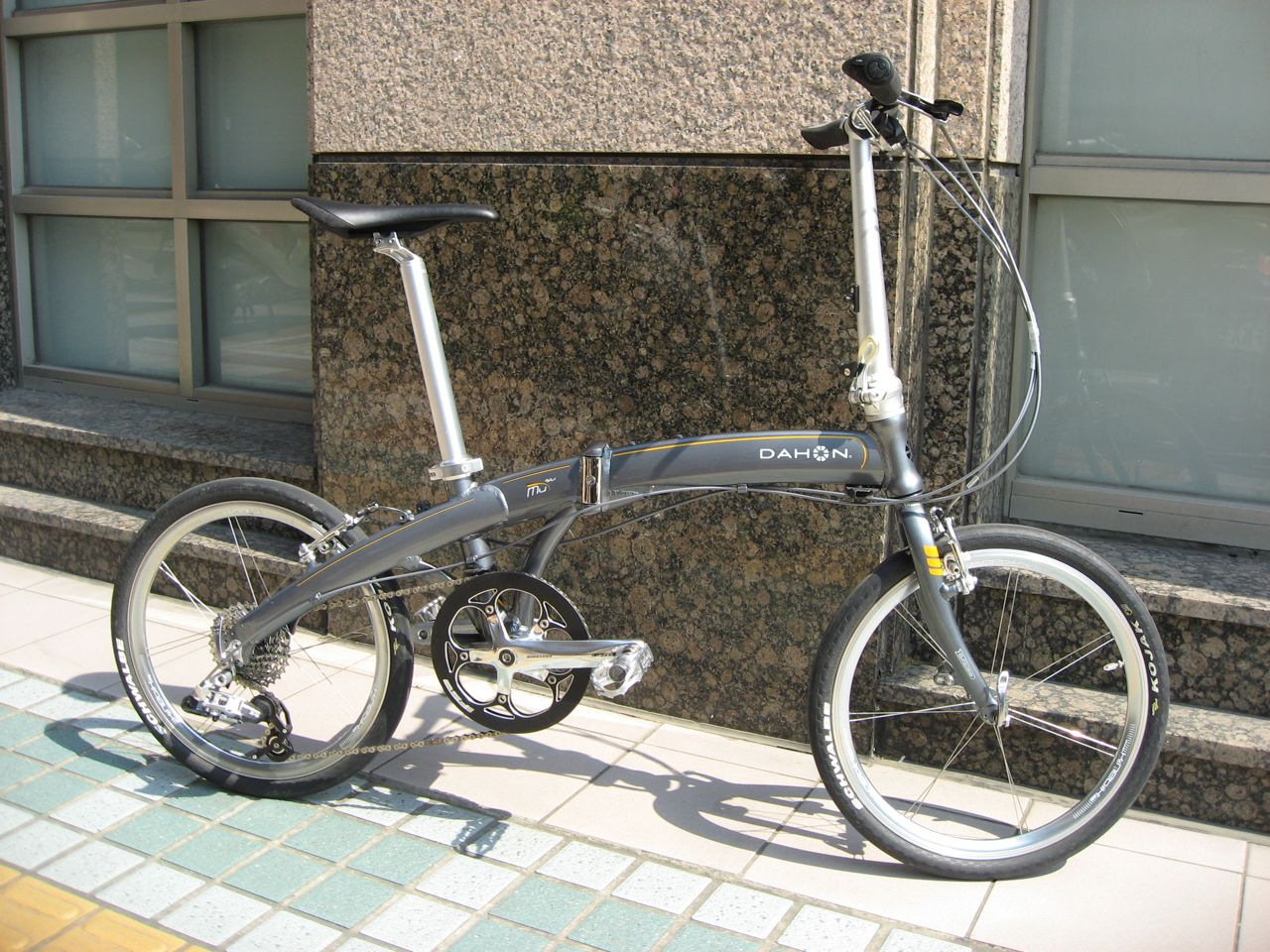
A Dahon folding bicycle with a cross frame

Another type of step-through frame is called a cross. The cross frame consists mainly of two tubes that form a cross: a seat tube from the bottom bracket to the saddle, and a backbone from the head tube to the rear hub.

== Gallery ==
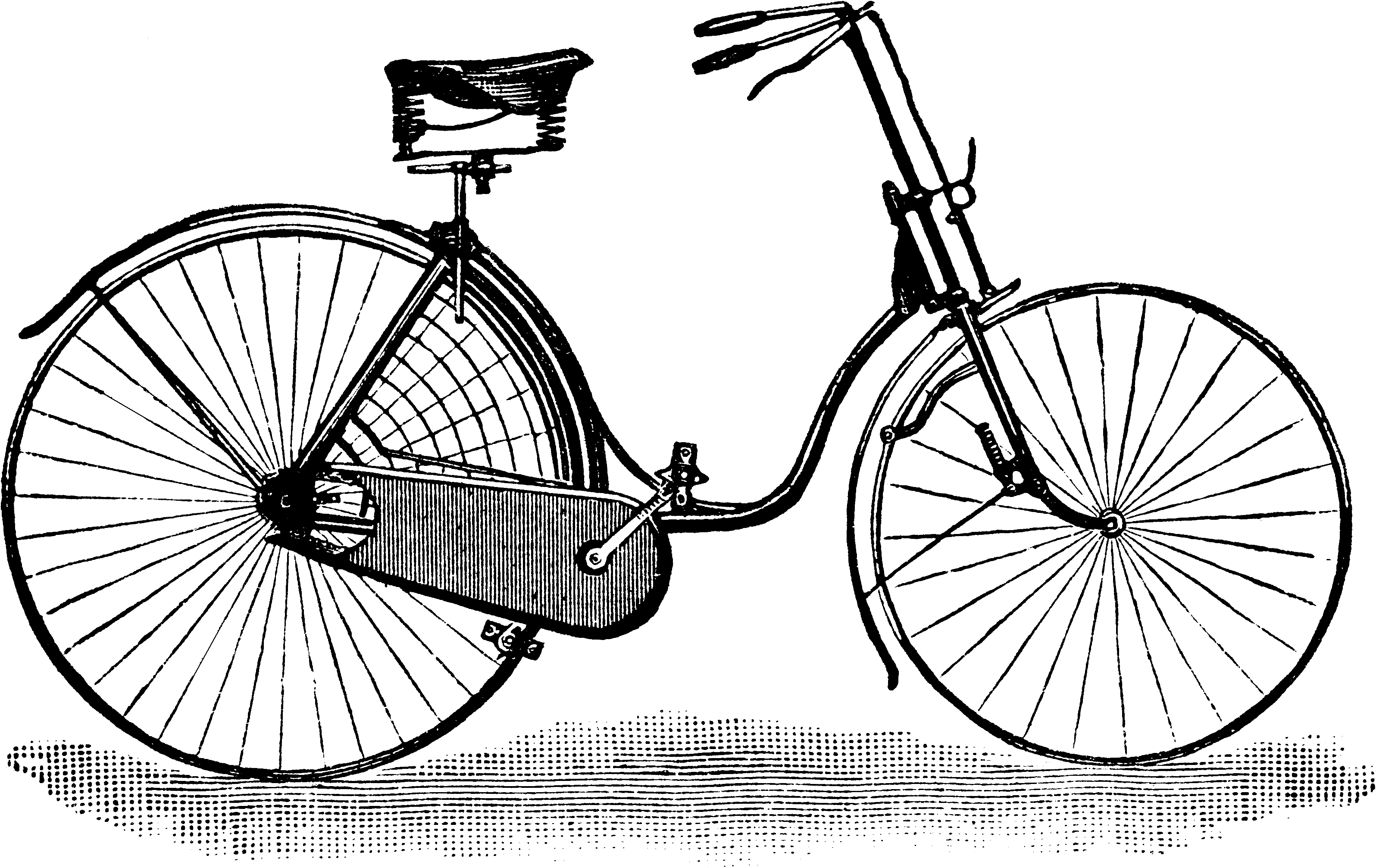
Image from an 1889 advertisement for a ladies' safety bicycle

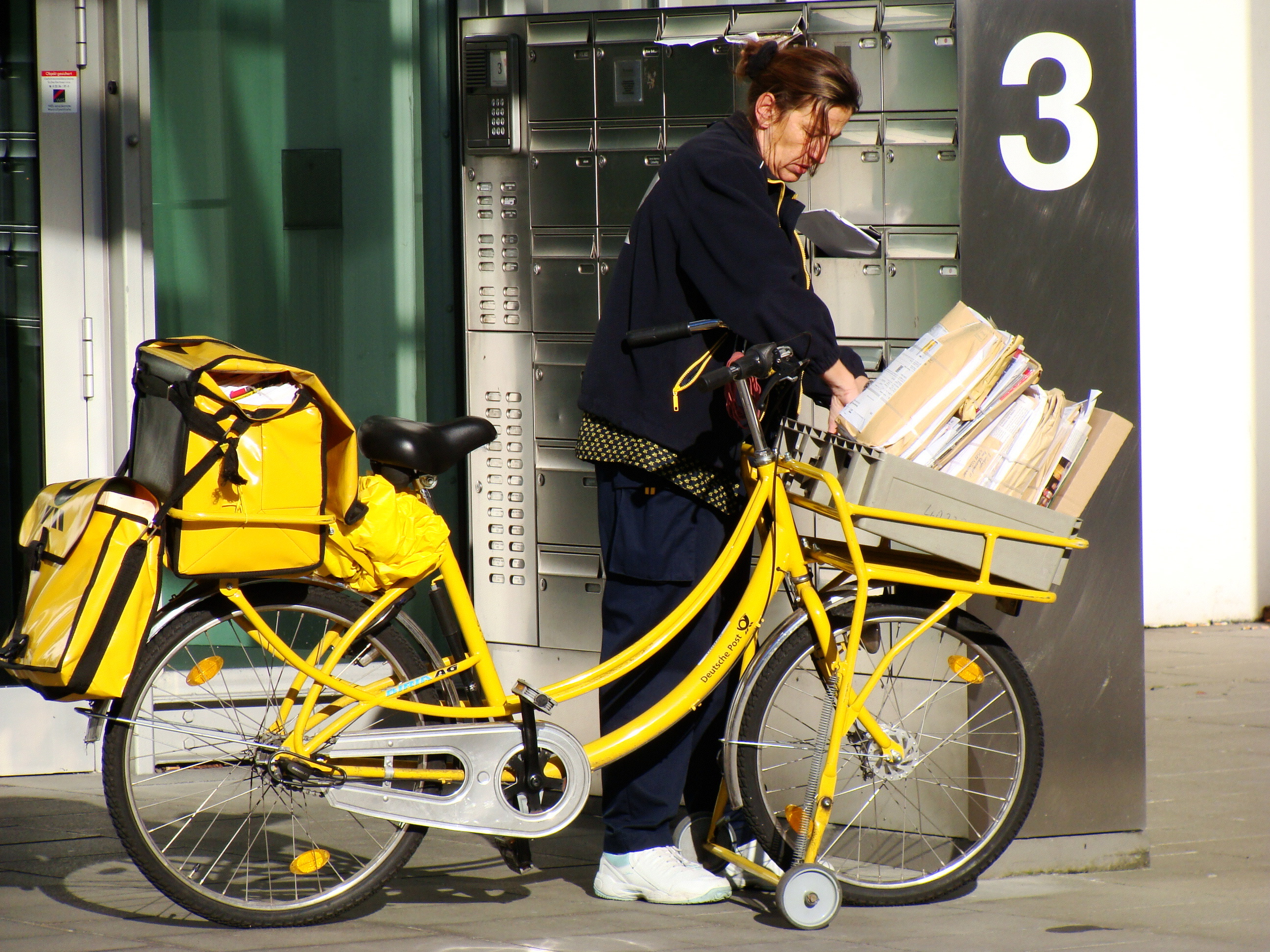
Postal delivery by bicycle in Cologne, Germany

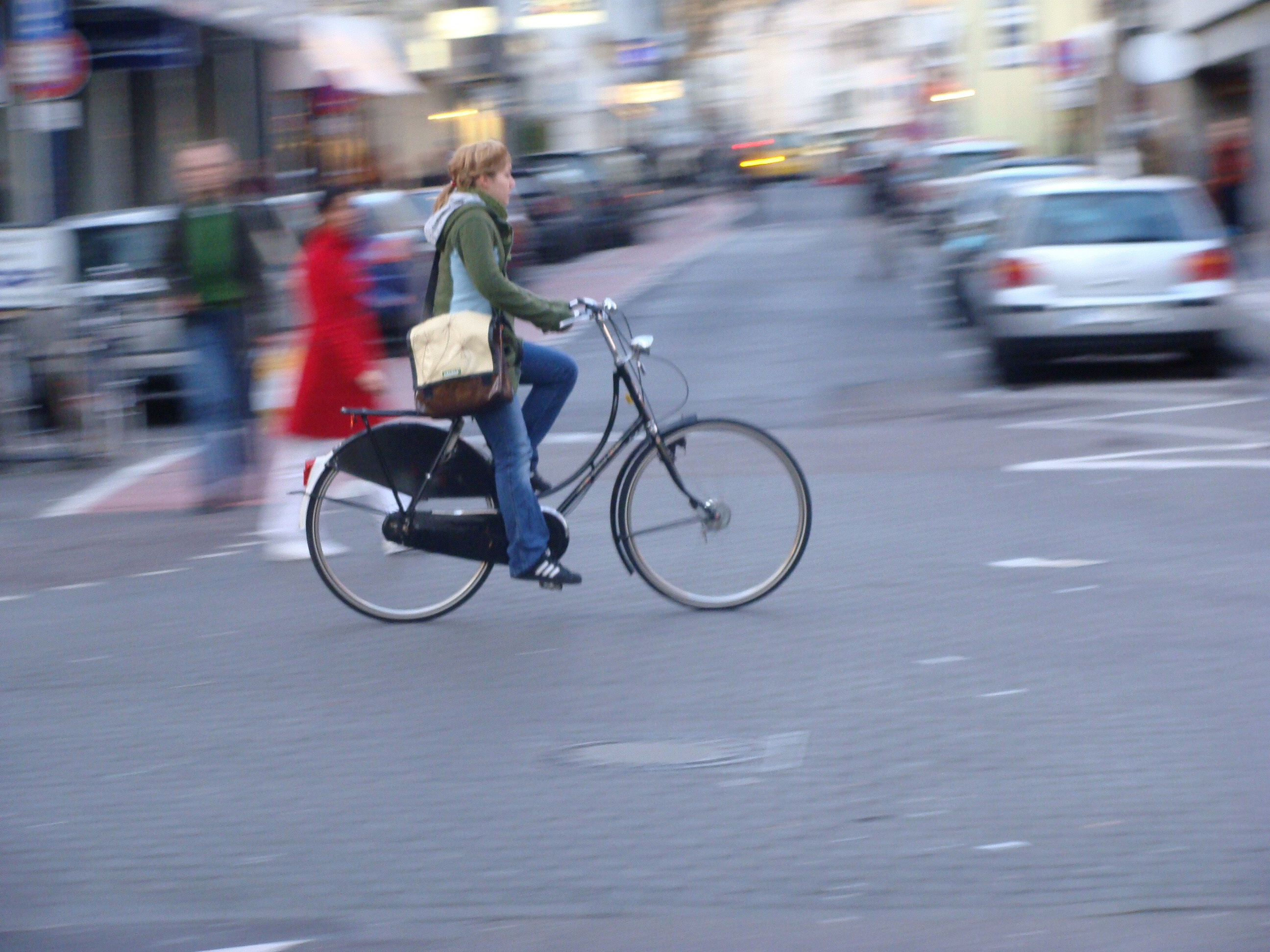
Cyclist in Cologne, Germany

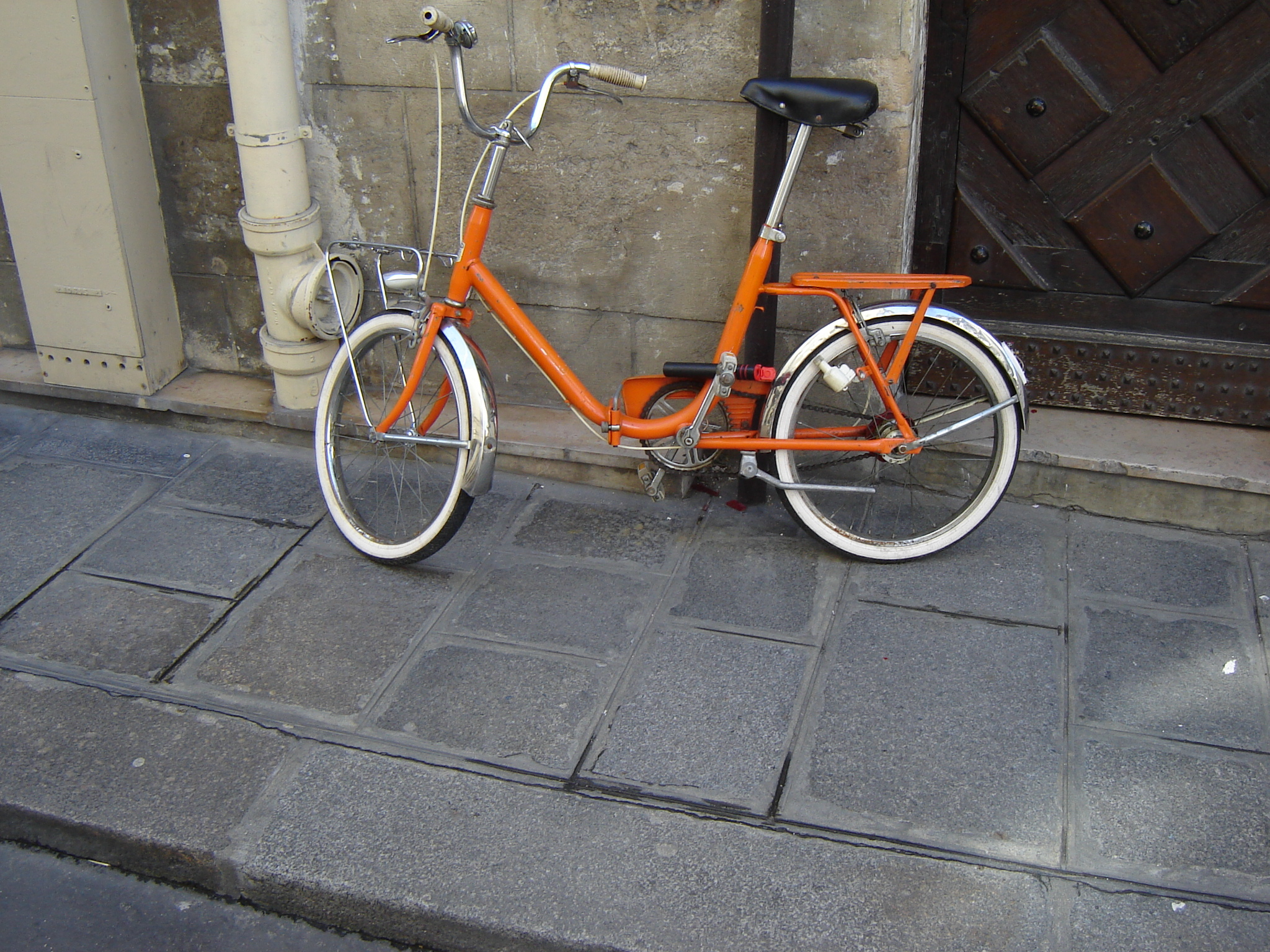
Folding bike

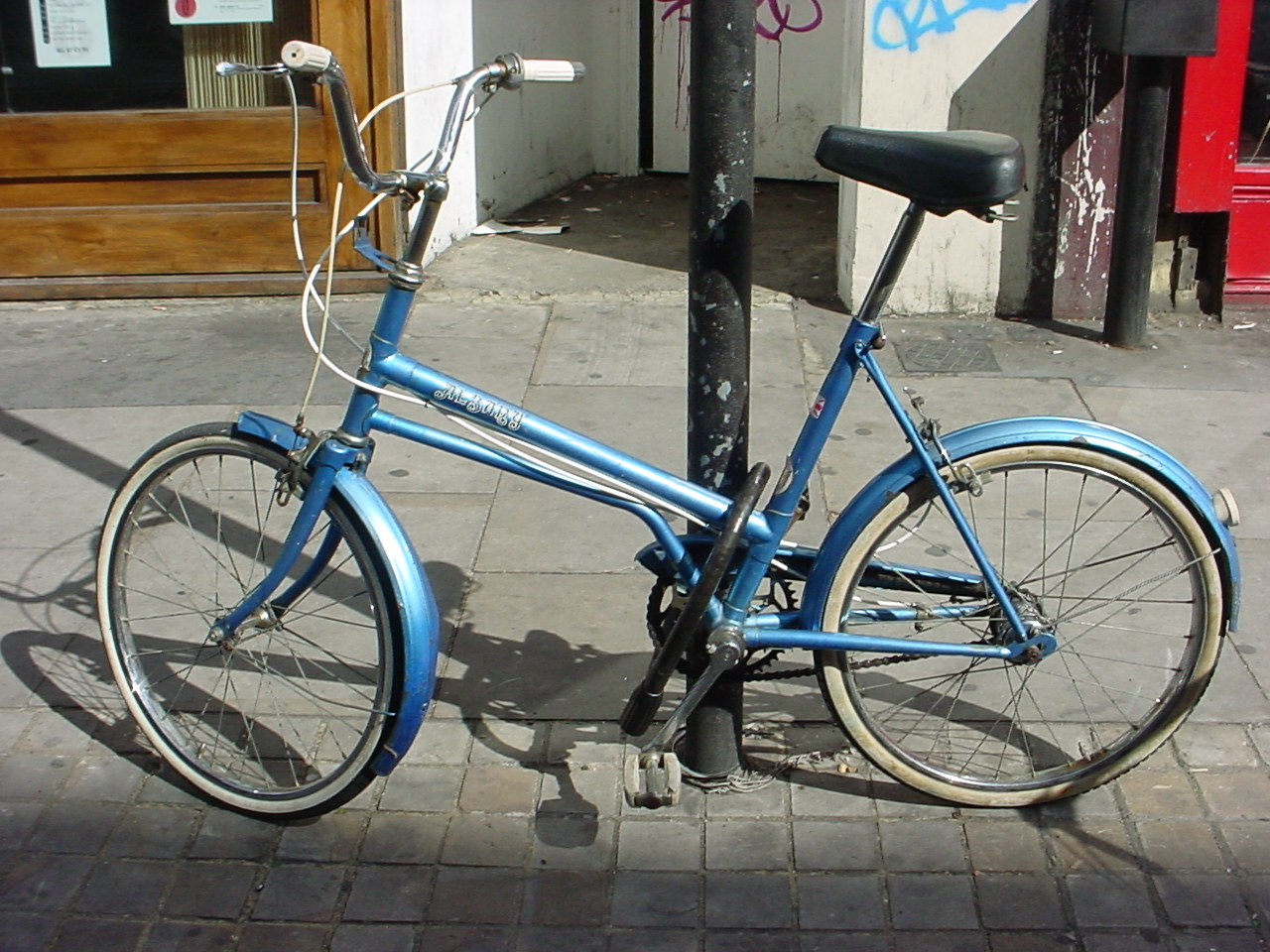
"Albany" bike

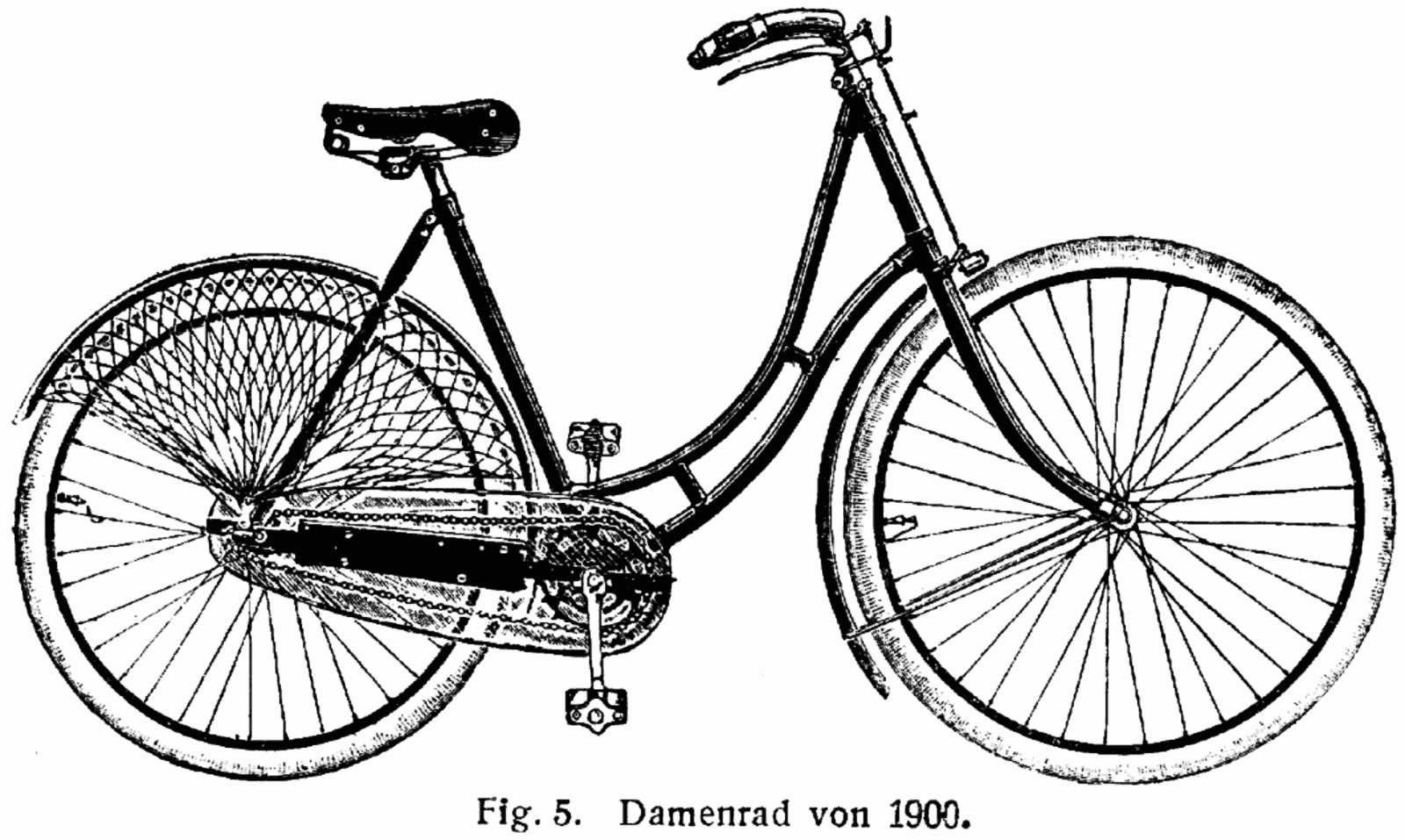
Damenrad from 1900

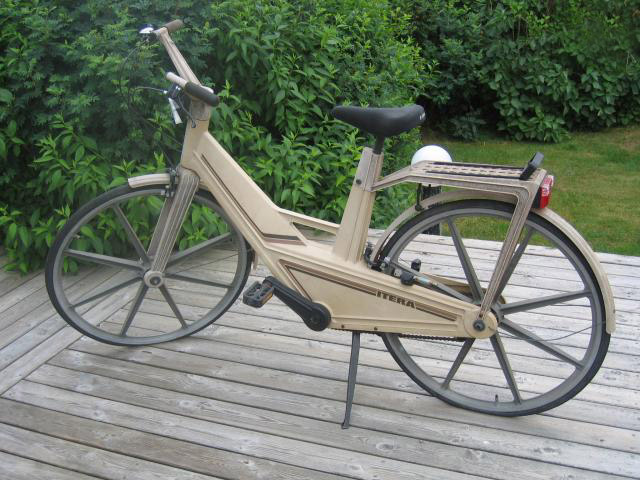
Itera plastic bicycle

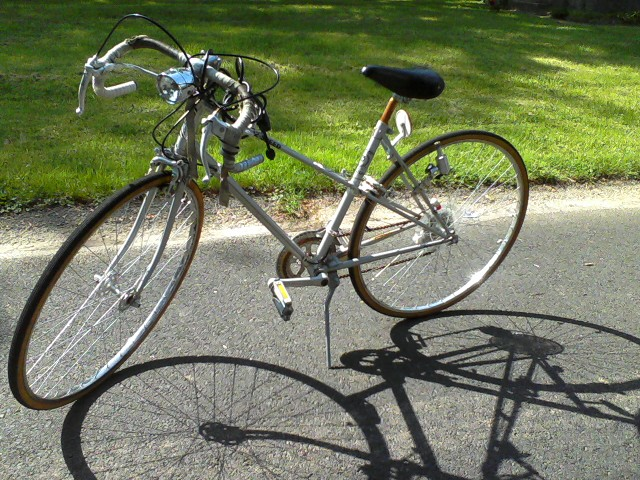
Kia mixte frame

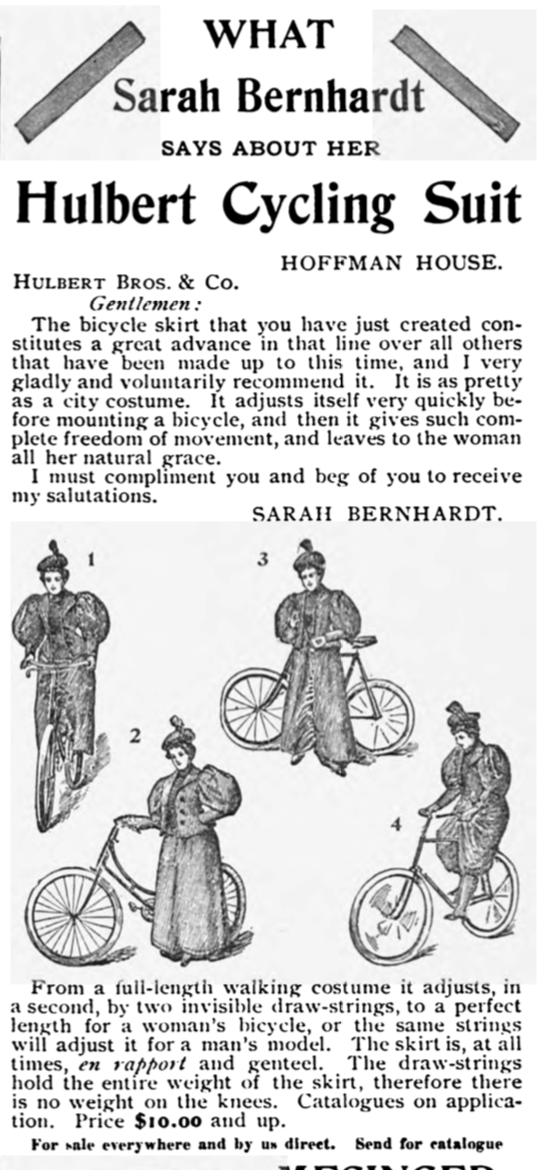
1896 ad for a women's cycling suit with drawstrings at the center front and back of the skirt, to raise it for riding either a dropped-tube or level-tube bike.

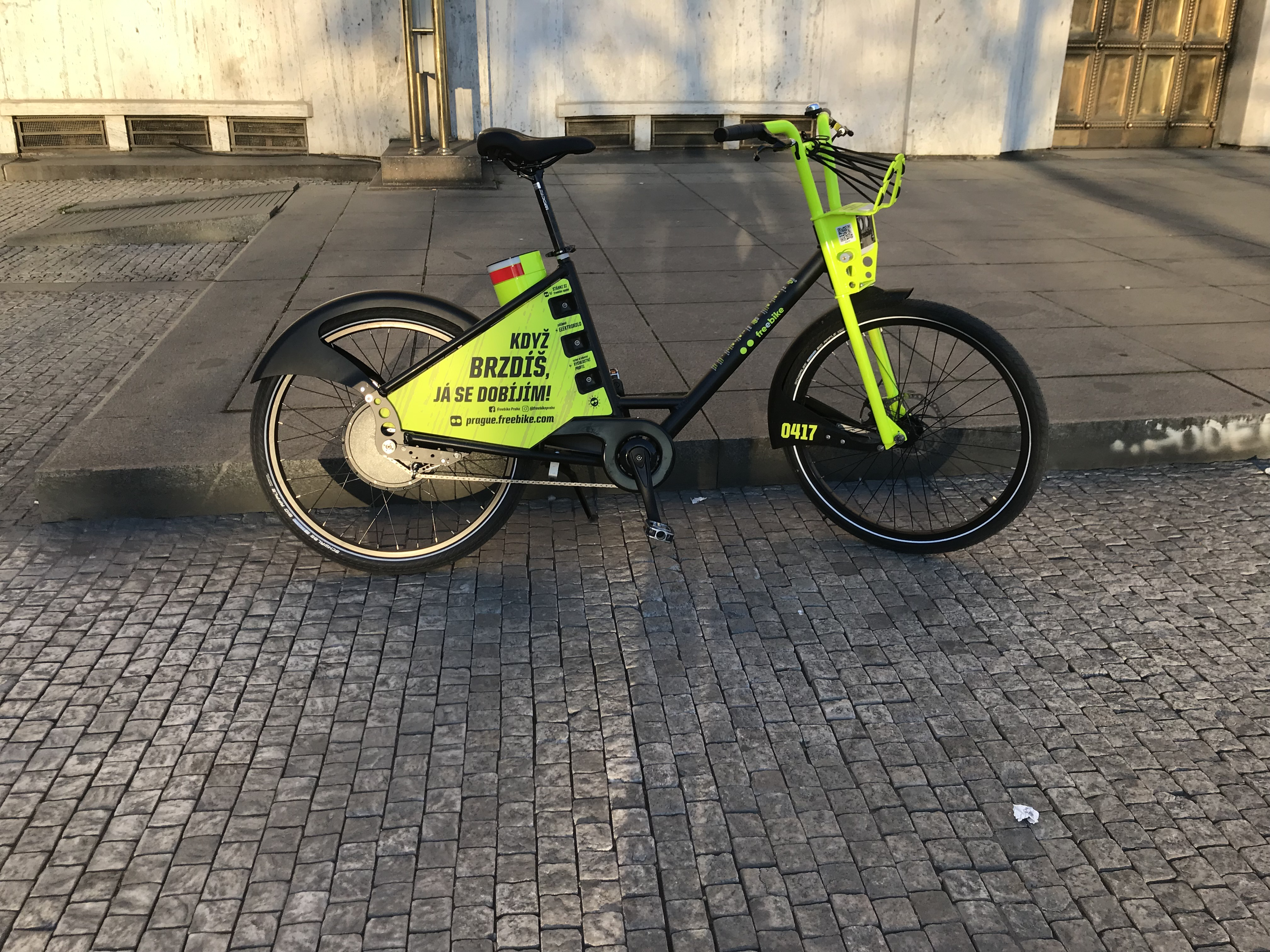
An ebike in Prague, part of a bikeshare program, showing an exceptionally low step-through design

== See also ==
- Bicycle frame
- Bicycling and feminism
