= Lancia Urban Bike =

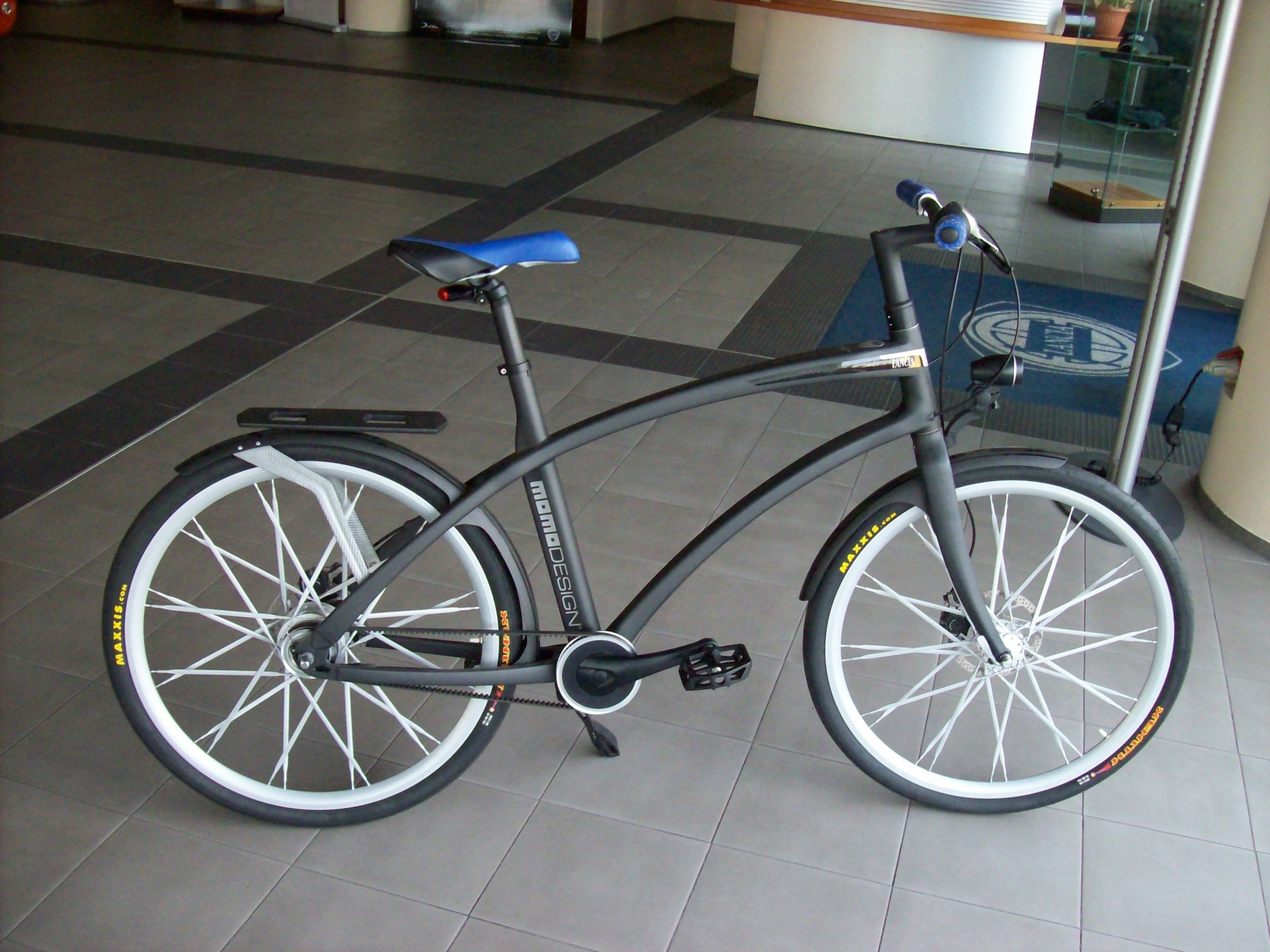
Lancia Urban Bike

The Lancia Urban Bike is a concept bicycle created by Italian automaker Lancia in collaboration with MomoDesign. Its manufacturers claim that the bicycle has been designed to account for riding performance and comfort while being minimal in weight. The bike has been described as rustproof, due to its parts being made from carbon fiber, aluminum and magnesium. Its frame is designed to absorb bumps, which abates the need for a suspension system.

== Technical characteristics ==
The bicycle's weight is less than 11 kg, and it has many aluminum parts. The gearbox is an eight-speed from Shimano, and the brakes are also from Shimano. The brake disc is 160 mm front and rear with mechanical calipers. The forks are aluminum while the frame and the handlebars are made from carbon.

== Production ==
It had been speculated in 2007 that if offered to consumers, the bicycle's price would be around £1,500 (approximately €1,900). It was reported in 2007 that the bicycle was available at Lancia dealers, with a price of €3,300.

== See also ==
- Utility bicycle
