= Skirt guard =

Bicycle rear wheel protective device

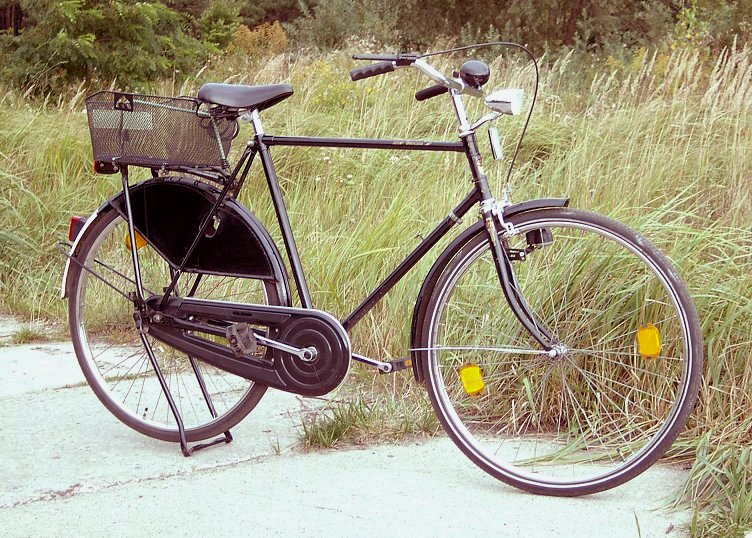
European city bike with skirt guard (large plate covering top of rear wheel), and full chain guard below

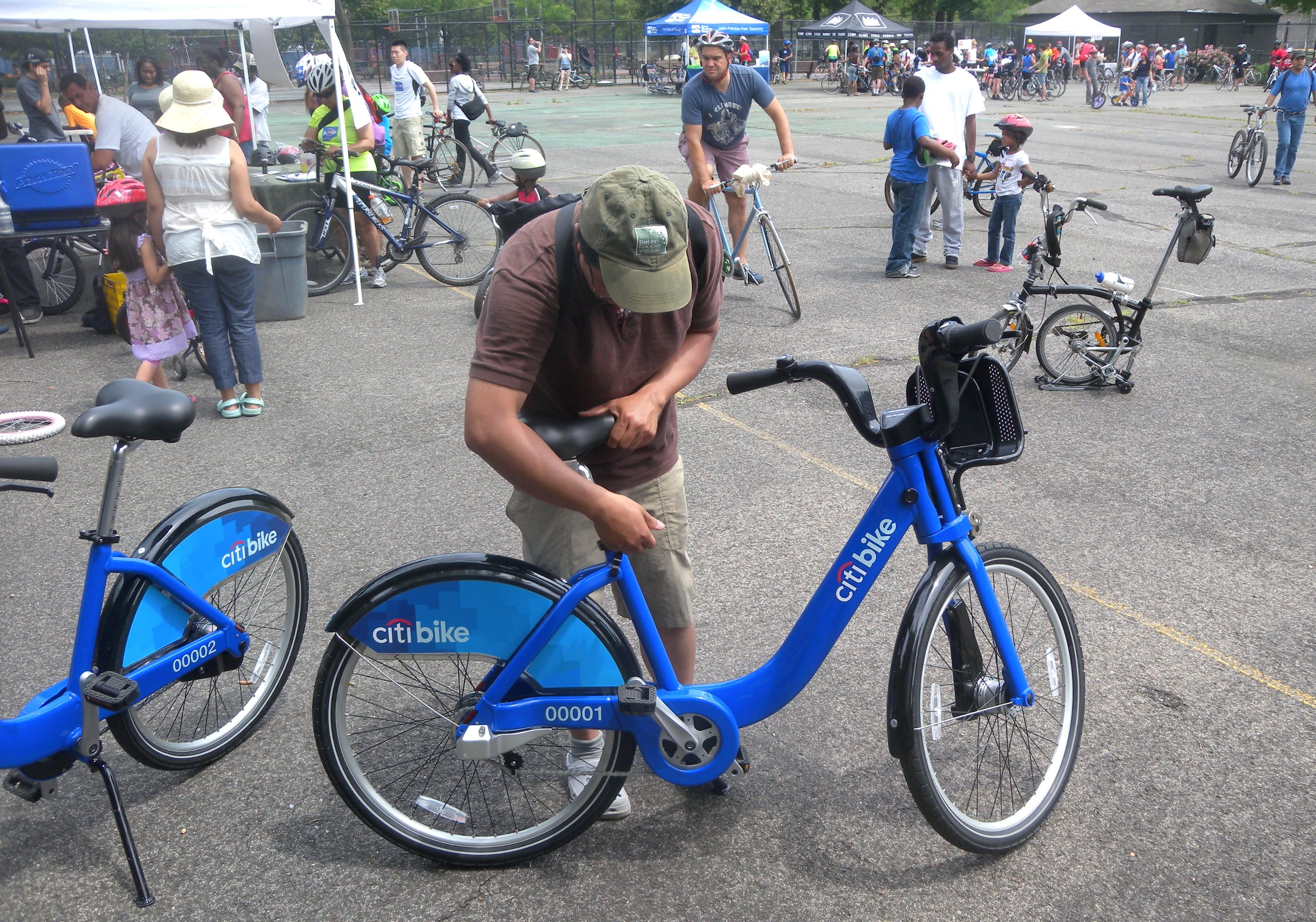
American Bike share bike with skirt guard and partial chain guard

A skirt guard, dress guard or coat guard is a device fitted over the rear wheel of a bicycle to prevent a long skirt, coat or other trailing clothes or luggage catching in the wheel, or in the gap between the rim and the brakes.

These guards also help prevent a child's foot becoming entangled in the spokes, when they are seated on a rear child seat or directly on a rear rack.

Skirt guards are common on bicycles in continental Europe, where the bicycle is commonly ridden in smart-casual or formal clothing; but very uncommon in English-speaking countries where many cyclists wear specialised cycling gear. It is often paired with a chain guard to keep the rider's clothing clean. They are often used on utility bicycles.

There are several forms, for instance:

- A length of string may be threaded through holes in the rear mudguard, running radially between the mudguard and the rear dropout.
- A lightweight metal mesh covering the upper half of the rear wheel.
- A fabric mesh or net stretched over the same area.
- A flexible canvas secured over the same area.
- A solid, rigid metal or plastic plate, which can be smaller than a canvas piece.

Large, solid surfaces have the disadvantage of air resistance, which increases the risk of being blown sideways by gusty sidewinds. Air-permeable designs such as mesh and string provide a more stable ride, but can be more difficult to keep clean. A pair of small plastic sheets gives moderate air resistance and a smooth surface which is easier to keep clean.

== See also ==
- Bicycle fender
