= Gear case =

Bicycle chain enclosure

A gear case, also known as a chain case or chain guard, is a protective enclosure for the bicycle's chain and sprocket assemblies. Its primary function is to protect the cyclist from being soiled or trapped in the chain rings while also protecting the chain from dirt and moisture. Gear cases may fully or partially enclose the drivetrain and sometimes incorporate an oil bath for continuous lubrication. Modern examples are usually moulded in plastic. Although they are also used by some touring bicycles as well as some chain-drive machinery, chain cases are most frequently found on utility bicycles.

== History ==
From the 1880s until the 1970s, bicycle chain cases were typically made from metal or varnished cloth. These materials provided protection against dirt and damage, with metal cases offering greater durability but increased weight and production cost.

In the mid-20th century, Willemine Johanna van der Woerd (née Looijen), director of the De Woerd bicycle accessory factory, improved the design of cloth chain cases. On 25 July 1959, she filed a patent for a closure for a chain case in which the seam had alternating open hooks. A wire could be zigzagged through these hooks to close the case, providing a closure that was easy to open and close while remaining under proper tension. This design became the standard for varnished cloth chain cases and remains in use by Dutch bicycle makers today.

In the late 1960s, van der Woerd introduced a plastic chain case. Together with technician Willem Gerritse, she has designed a one-piece chain case that was later optimized into a two-part design. In comparison to earlier cloth or metal cases, this innovation improved durability, simplified assembly, and decreased production costs.

== Gallery ==
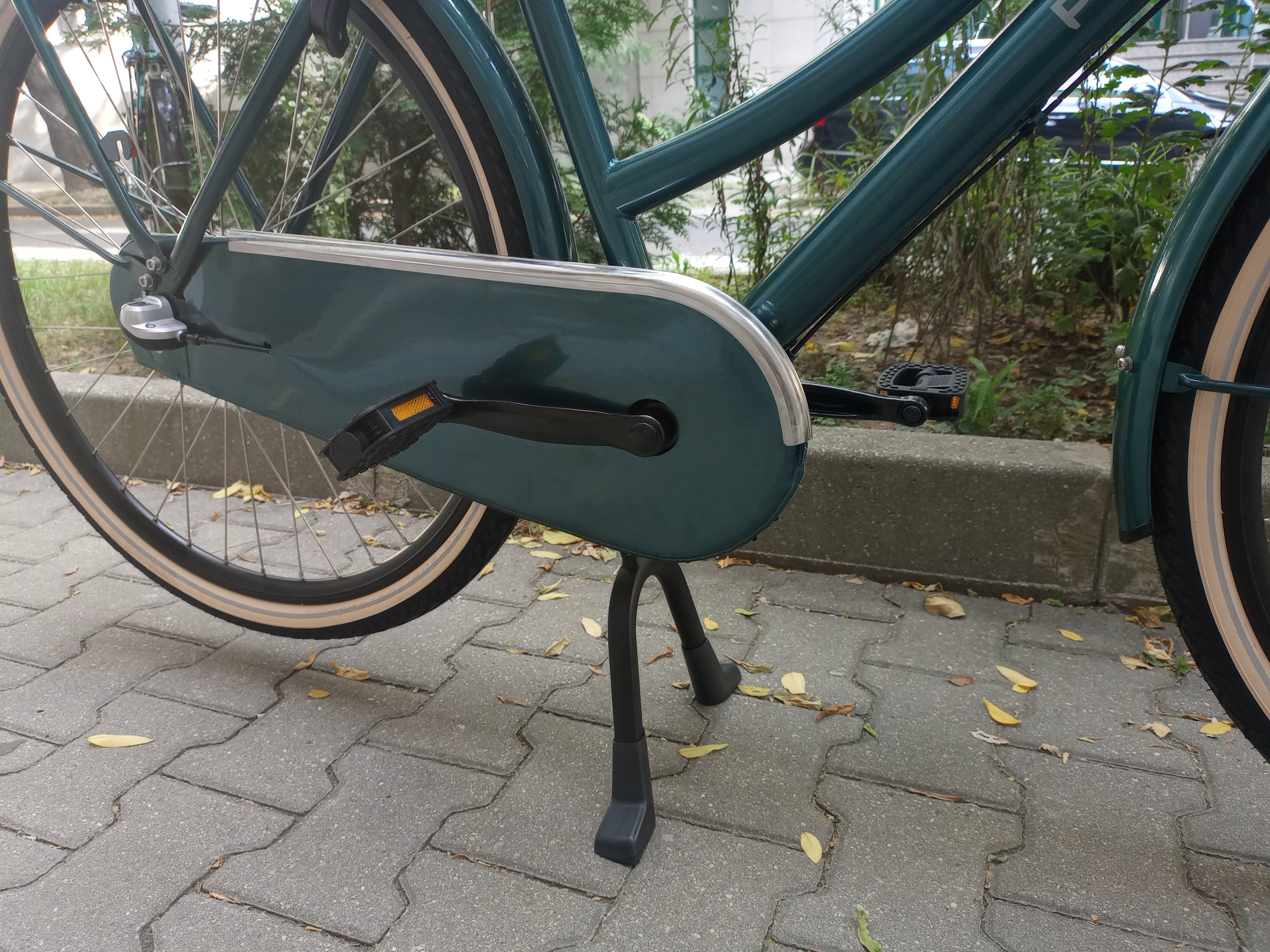
Fully enclosed cloth chain case on a Dutch bike

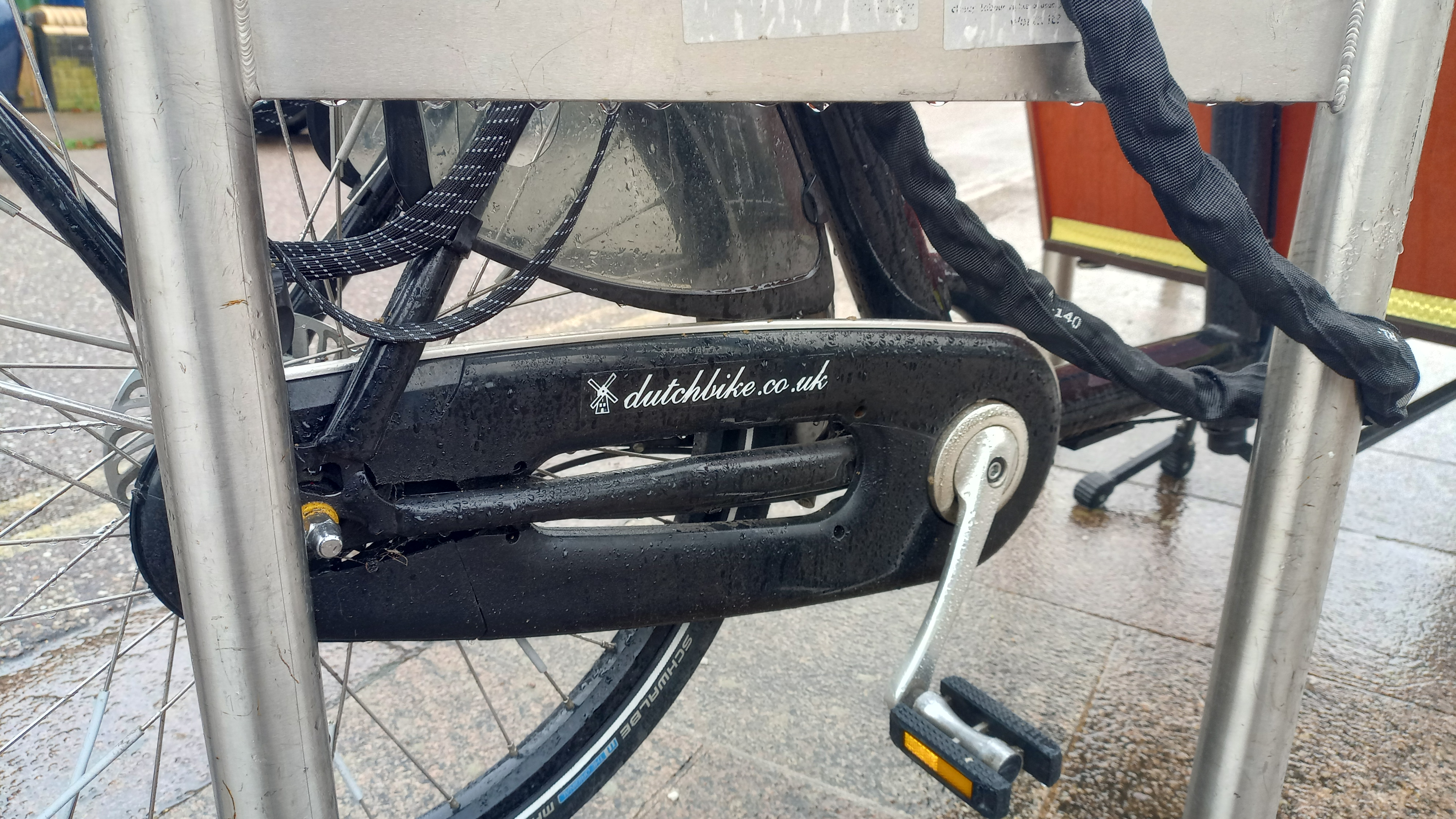
Modern fully enclosed plastic chain case

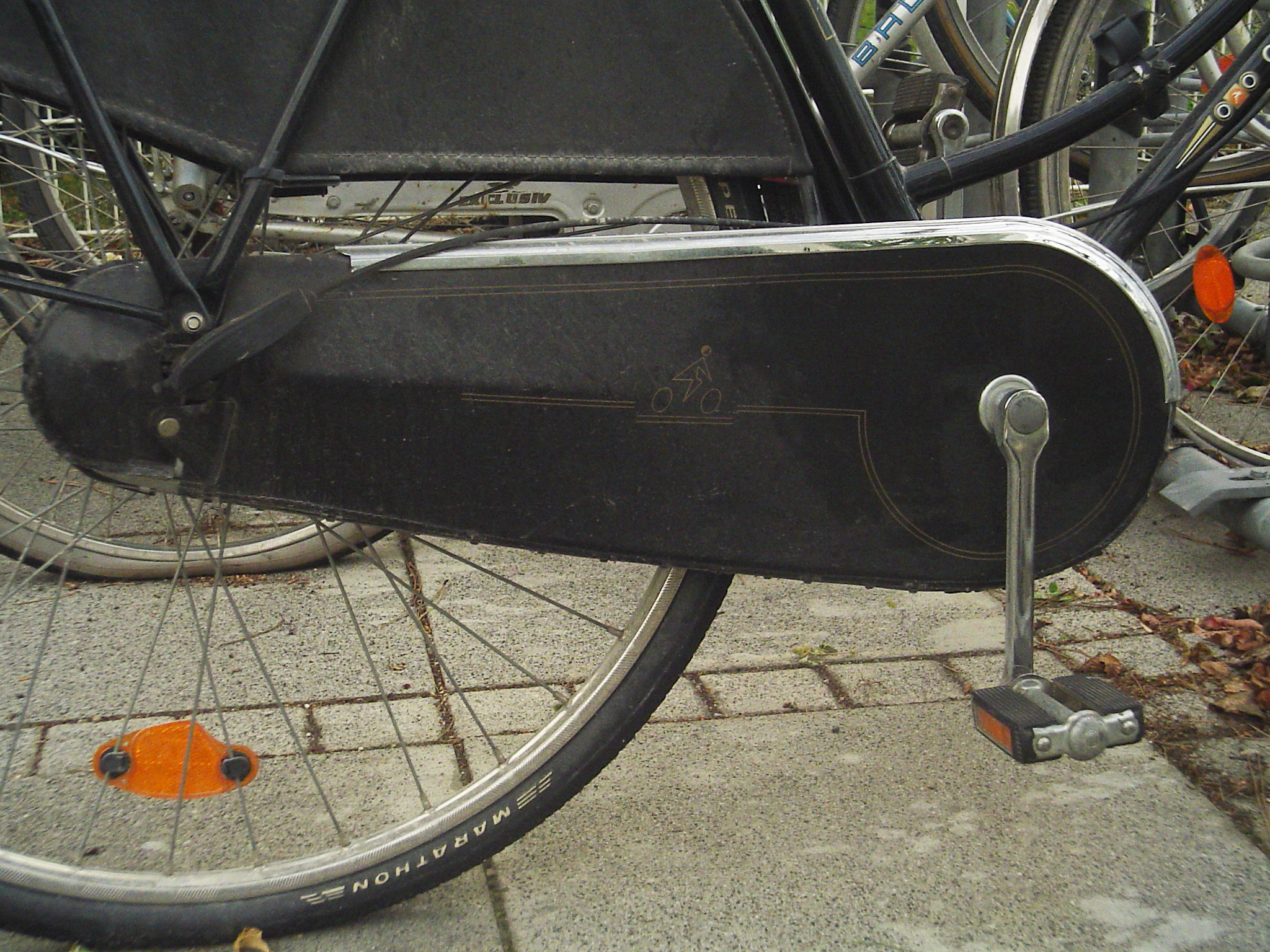
Old-style fully enclosed plastic chain case imitating the cloth chain case

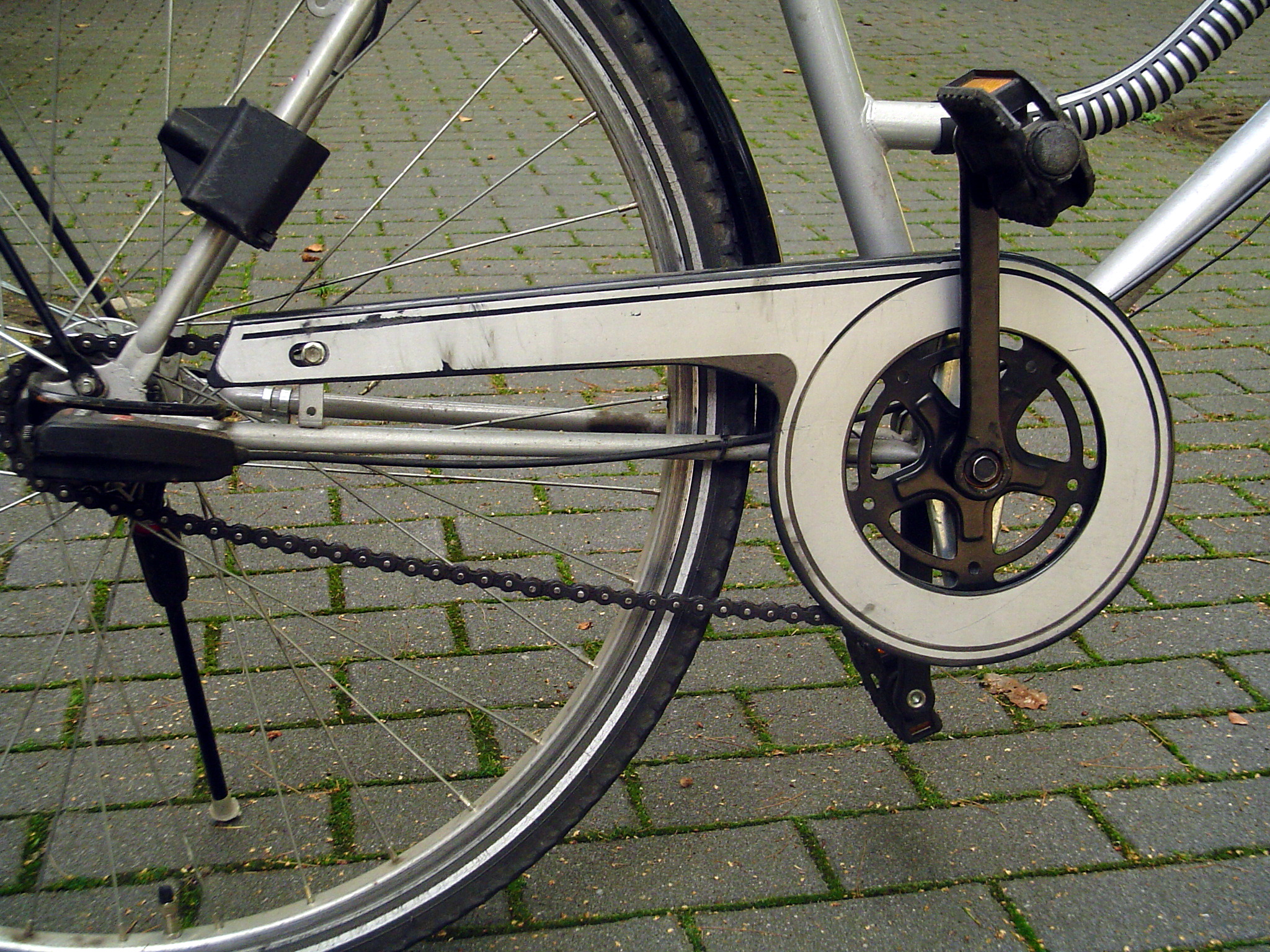
Partially enclosed chain case

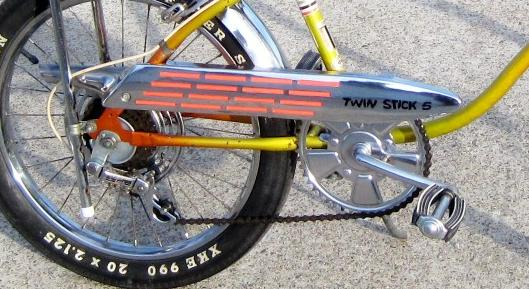
Huffy Flaming Stack chain guard

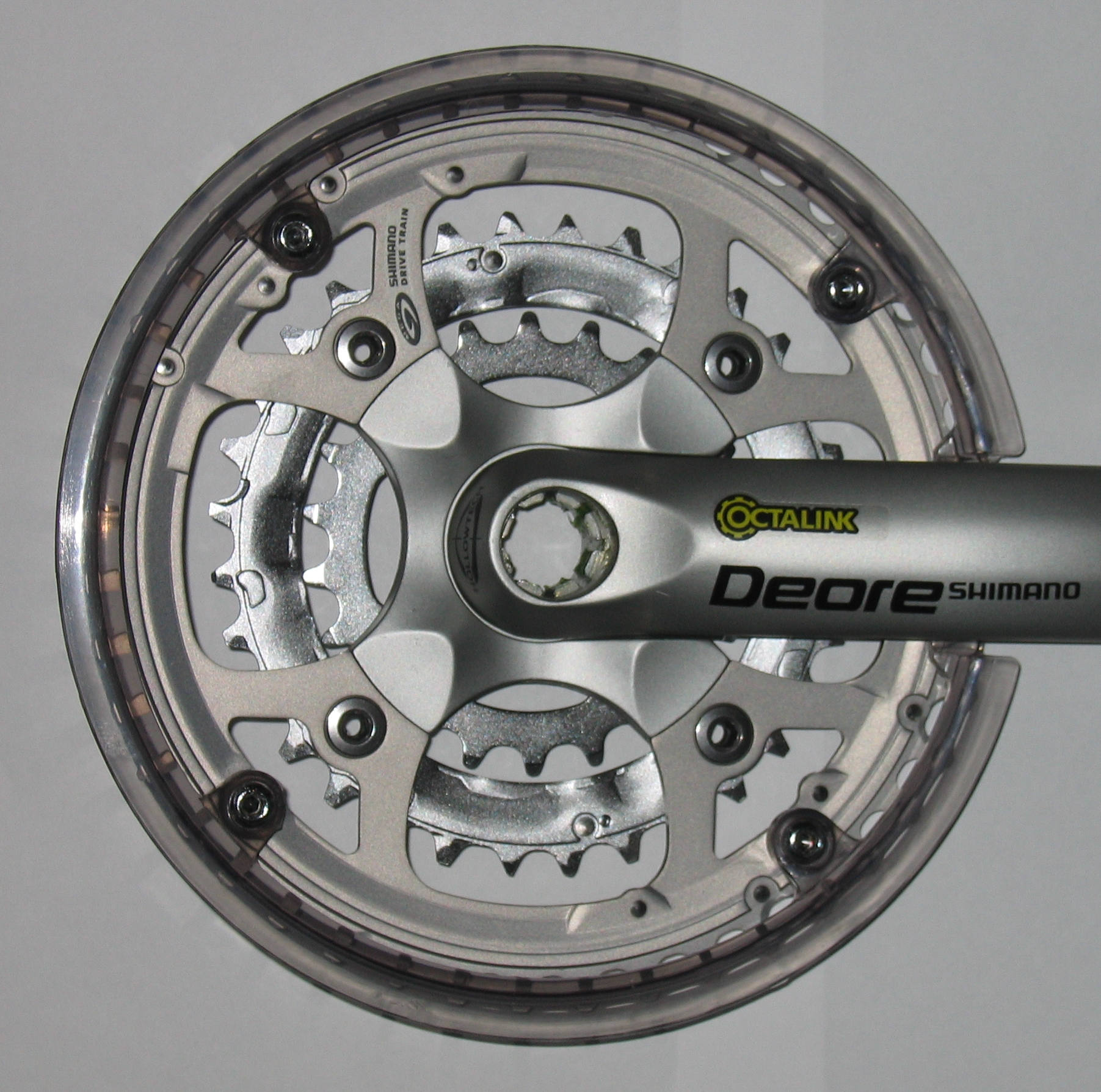
Crankset with an integrated chainguard bolted to the outside of the largest chainring

== See also ==
- Luggage carrier
