= Utility bicycle =

Bicycle for practical use (commuting, transport)

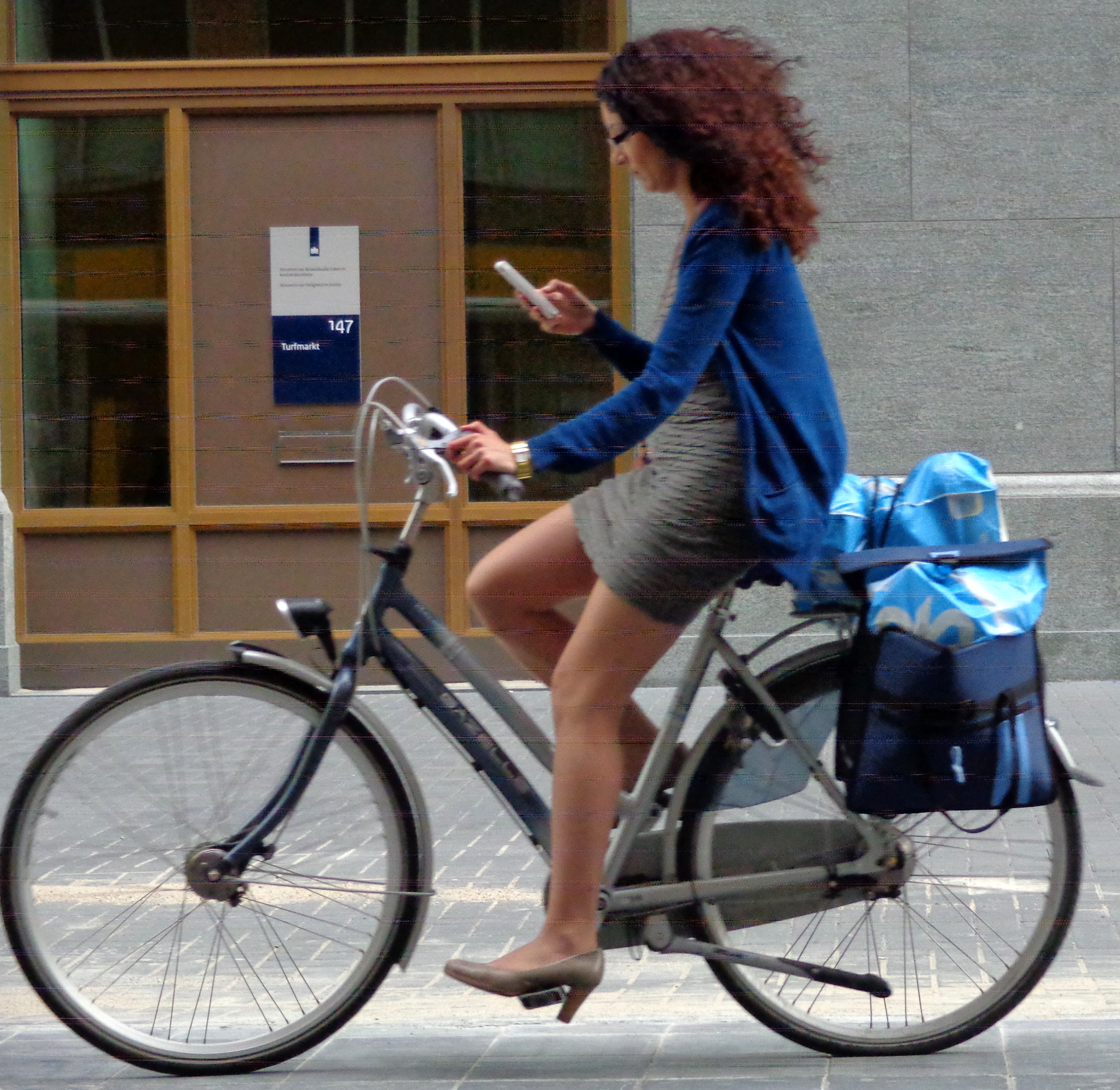
A city bike with a step-through frame is practical for easy mounting in and out. Straight sitting position focusing on comfort instead of speed.

A utility bicycle, city bicycle, urban bicycle, European city bike (ECB), Dutch bike, classic bike or simply city-bike is a bicycle designed for frequent short rides through urban areas. It is a form of utility bicycle commonly seen around the world, built to facilitate everyday riding in normal clothes in a variety of weather conditions. It is therefore a bicycle designed for practical transportation, as opposed to those primarily for recreation and competition, such as touring bicycles, road bicycles, and mountain bicycles. Utility bicycles are the most common form globally, and comprise the vast majority found in the developing world. City bikes may be individually owned or operated as part of a public bike sharing scheme.

Generally as they are more suitable for urban environments, they focus more on comfort and practicality instead of speed or efficiency. They normally have a slightly curved, roughly planar aligned and elevated handlebar, providing users an upright sitting position. They have fewer gears and they often are heavier than road bicycles. They might have the top central frame bar diagonally aligned for allowing easy mounting in and out and they might have a back or front frame for transport of items. The saddle is typically larger compared with other bicycles and the majority are provided with chain and tire protection against oil or dirt.

== History ==
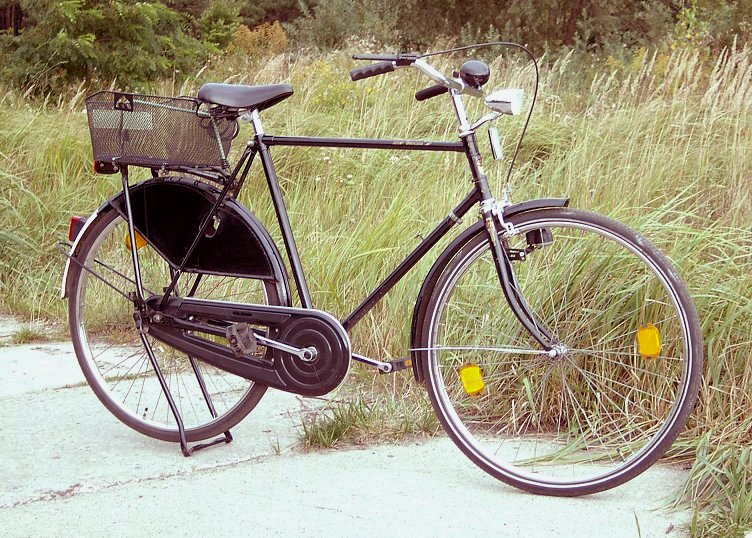
A traditional Dutch roadster

Bicycles have been promoted for their utilitarian strengths since before they were technically known as bicycles. The dandy horse and the boneshaker were hoped to become an inexpensive utilitarian alternative to horses by their makers. However the inherent danger, cost, discomfort, and restrictive gender roles of the day, kept it popular mainly with wealthy adventurous young men, and mainly for recreation and sport. The development of penny-farthing moved away from the utilitarian goal of earlier forms, with its less stable ride, and difficulty carrying much baggage. It furthered the trend of bicycles to be used by young men, willing to take risks, for sport and recreation. Despite this, we find the earliest mention of working bikes in 1874, in Paris, as couriers, for a newspaper and the stock market riding penny-farthings.

It was the introduction of the safety bicycle that was successful for the first time to build a bicycle that worked well for utilitarian purposes, "a poor man's nag". It was this development that was the cause of the bicycle boom of the 1890s. The main use of bicycles during the boom was still sport and recreation, but additionally they were adopted by many professions such as police, postal workers, delivery men, municipal workers and for basic transportation of people of all classes, races, and genders. In the US, after the boom, use changed dramatically from sport and recreation to basic transportation. By 1902, as the boom was coming to an end, nearly all cyclists were cycling for practical purposes. The price of bicycles dropped dramatically, due to increased competition between makers and more price-conscious consumers; profits dried up and many of the cycling manufacturers went out of business. The history is similar in the UK, but there some of the manufacturers were better able to handle the transition to transportation based cycling, even to the point of talking of a second boom due to so many working-class people taking up cycling. Additionally the British makers were able to tap into the developing markets overseas, primarily India, China, and Japan. In countries like the US, the use of utility bicycles all but disappeared until after the Second World War, when a few British and Italian roadster-type bicycles saw a brief upsurge in popularity. Since the Second World War, utility bicycles have remained popular in countries like the Netherlands, China, and much of the developing world.

=== Technological improvements ===
Since the 1890s only incremental mechanical advances have taken place for the majority of the world's utility bicycles. In fact many bicycles in Asia still employ rod brakes. One exception to this was the continued development of substitute propulsion systems for utility bicycles in the form of add-on gasoline engines and transmissions. Developed shortly after 1900 in Europe and the United States, motorized utility bicycles surged in popularity in Western Europe after the Second World War. Typically, a small one or two-horsepower, two-cycle engine was fitted with a tire roller-drive mechanism that would convert any standard utility roadster into a motorised bicycle. As they could still be propelled by human power, they were considered as bicycles under most national registration schemes. The motorised utility bicycle or cyclemotor offered greater range, faster commutes, and increased versatility to a large sector of the postwar European consumer market that could not afford expensive automobiles or motorcycles.

In 1962, the advent of the Moulton bicycle brought a fresh outlook to the traditional utility concept. Using small, easily transportable frames and wheels as well as suspension, the Moulton was designed to accommodate the increasing public usage of bicycles in concert with other forms of mass transportation. During the 1990s, several bicycle designs were introduced in an attempts to improve on the traditional utility bike. Most of these centered on the use of lightweight frame alloys, new brake and gearing systems, and electronic navigation and monitoring assistance.

== Use ==
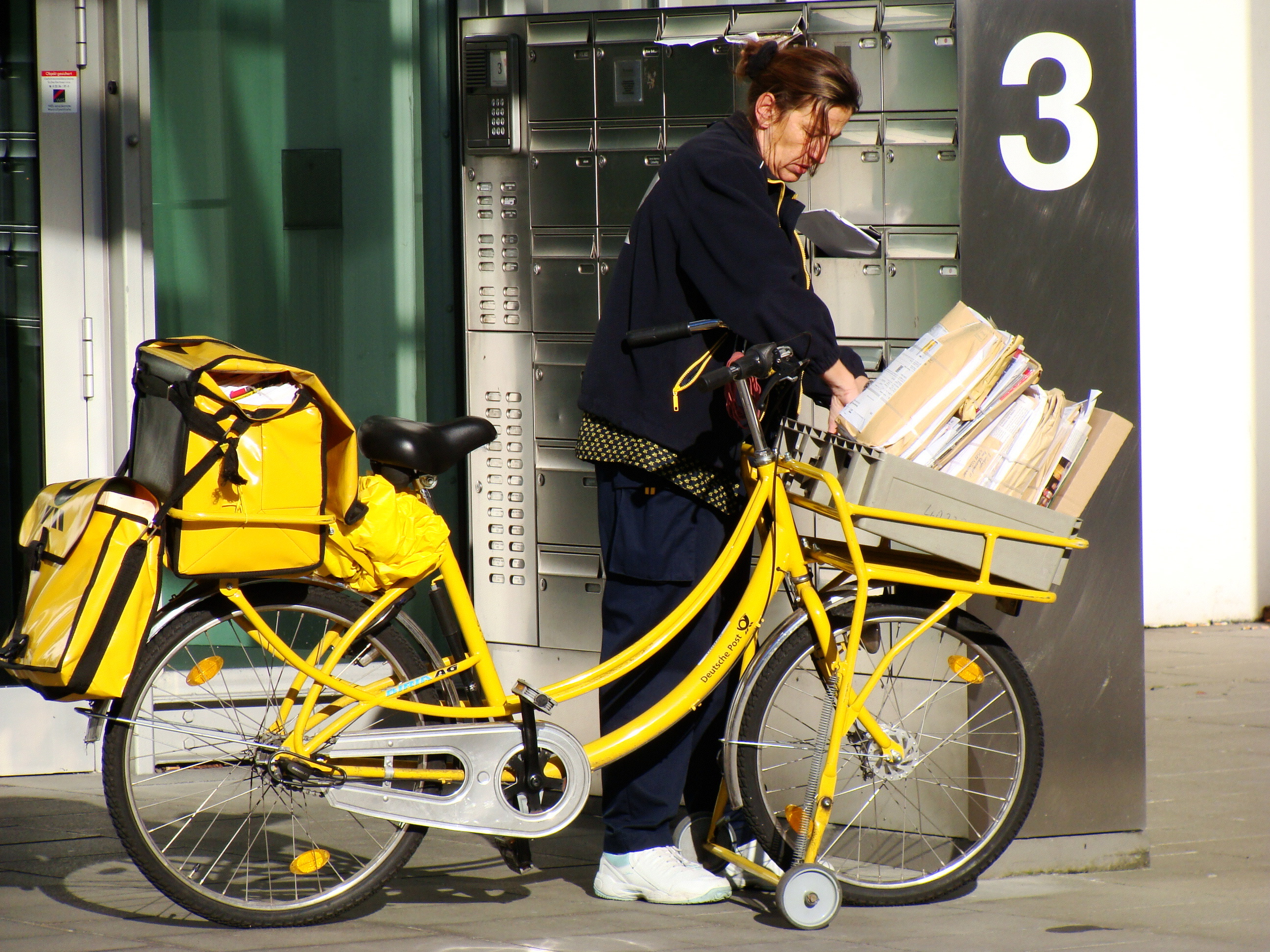
Deutsche Post delivery bike in Cologne.

Utility bicycles are principally used for short-distance commuting, running errands, shopping, leisure or for transporting goods or merchandise. Utility bicycles may also be seen in postal service, in war, and for employee transportation inside large workplaces (factories, warehouses, airports, movie studio lots, etc.). In some countries, entire fleets of utility bicycles may be operated or administered by local or national government agencies as part of a public bike sharing programme.

The utility bicycle is the most widely used form of bicycle in many undeveloped parts of the world. While motor vehicles have displaced bicycles for personal transportation in many industrialized and post-industrial nations, rising fuel costs and concerns over the environment have led many people to once again turn to utility bicycles for a variety of daily tasks. In countries where purpose-built utility bikes are unavailable or unsuited to local conditions, many cyclists have acquired hybrid bicycles, road bicycles, mountain bikes, or touring bicycles for commuting and general utility use, often refurbishing older or secondhand models. A few countries, notably China, India, Japan, Netherlands, Denmark and the Flemish Region of Belgium, continue to produce versions of the utility bike. In addition, the Deutsche Post uses a version of a utility bike in most German cities for delivering mail.

== Design ==
Utility bicycles often feature a step-through frame so they can be easily mounted, single speed, or with internal hub gearing, and drum brakes to reduce the need for maintenance, mudguards to keep the rider's clothing clean, a chain guard to prevent skirts or loose trousers from being caught in the chain, a skirt guard to prevent a long coat or skirt catching in the rear wheel or brakes, a center stand kickstand so it can be parked easily, and a basket or pannier rack to carry personal possessions or shopping bags.

A traditional type of utility bicycle, the roadster may weigh as much as 16–23 kg (35 to 50 lbs). Parts such as frames, wheels/rims, and tires are chosen for strength, safety, and durability rather than high performance. Additionally, utility bikes tend to incorporate fewer technological advances in material design and engineering in comparison to road bicycles, though there are exceptions. In particular, the small-tired Moulton portable utility cycles incorporate advanced engineering with slightly lighter weight.

Most utility bikes feature an upright riding position. The handlebars are almost always curved back and positioned higher than the saddle so that the rider can operate controls without changing their riding posture. The saddle is also placed right above the rear wheel axle instead of the bottom bracket, which makes it more difficult to pedal. Some people add a child seat or a trailer. The utility bike's combination of parts, design, and features provide functionality and comfort at the expense of weight, an adequate compromise when used as originally intended (local commuting and short rides).

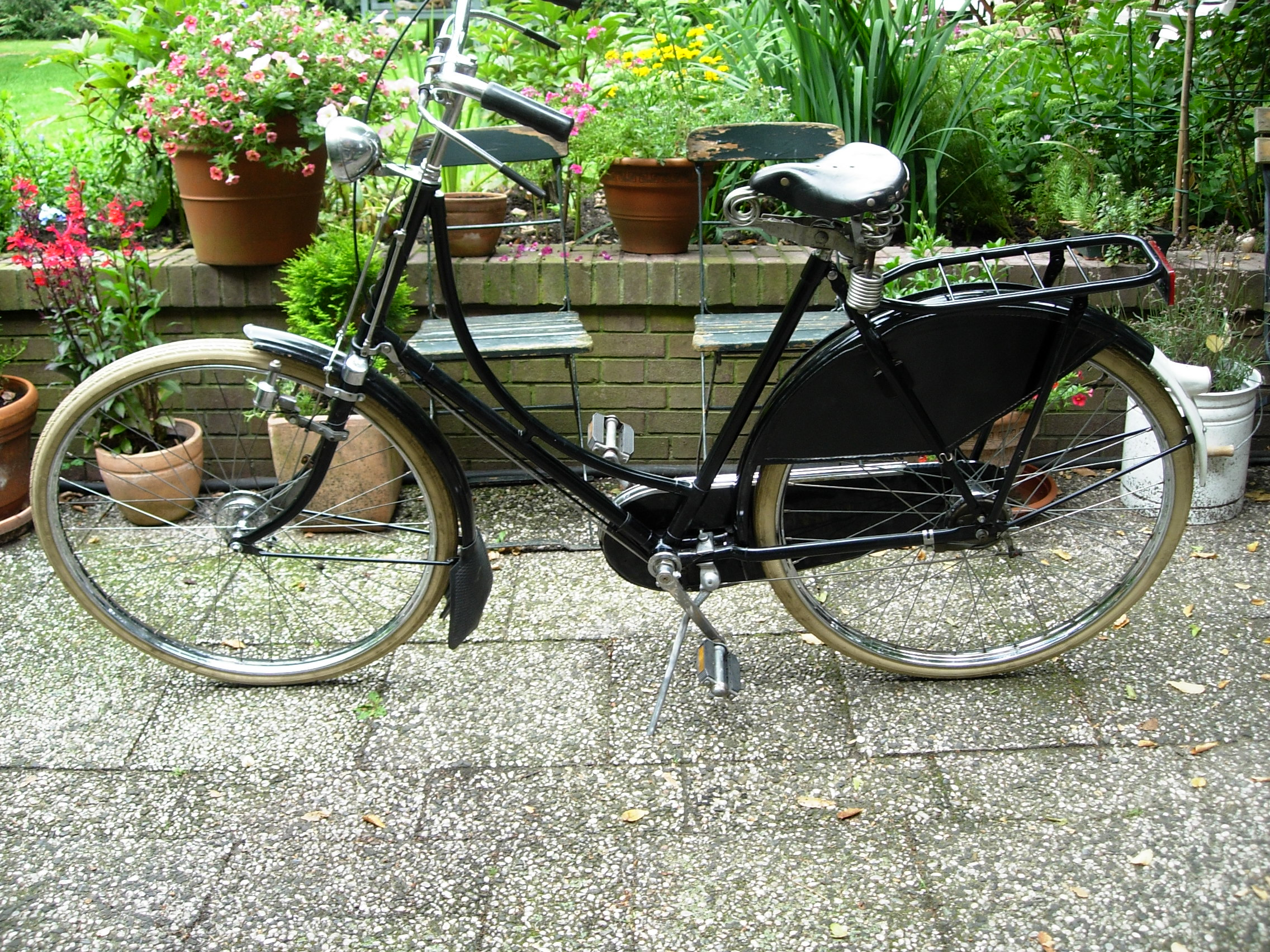
A vintage omafiets, the Dutch ladies' bicycle

=== Stadsfiets as a defining term ===
The Dutch stadsfiets has the full set of features commonly incorporated into a utility bicycle. The Dutch words fiets and stadsfiets mean 'bicycle' and 'city bicycle', respectively. A stadsfiets is considered to be a fully outfitted European city bike, distinguished by the following typical features: upright riding position, fully enclosed chaincase, skirtguard, ring lock, hub gearing, dynamo hub, manually operated small warning bell, and built-in lights.

German and Dutch versions of the European city bike are similar, though there are differences.

The English roadster is similar in design, appearance, and intended use. The primary differences are that the continental bicycles tend to have a higher handlebar position for a more upright riding posture, and are more likely to have rod-actuated drum brakes. Because of Great Britain's cultural and trading influence in its former colonies, the roadster can still be seen in local production and use in many countries of the world.

=== Traditional vs. contemporary design ===
A traditional-styled European city bike includes a frame made of low-carbon high-tensile steel, black paint with chromed accessories, an opaque skirt guard, bottle dynamo, simple dynamo-powered lights, and either a single-speed or 3-speed internally geared hub.

Contemporary city bikes are increasingly found in many European cities, including Amsterdam and Copenhagen. Dutch and Danish-made city bikes often include such features as a clear skirt guard, colors other than black, aluminium alloy or chromoly steel frame, front suspension fork, suspension seatpost, hub dynamo, dynamo lighting with motion-and-darkness detection, magnetic lights, a 7- or 8-speed hub, adjustable kickstand, child seats, and a headlight integrated into the front fork. Newer German models, on the other hand, tend to incorporate a less is more philosophy.

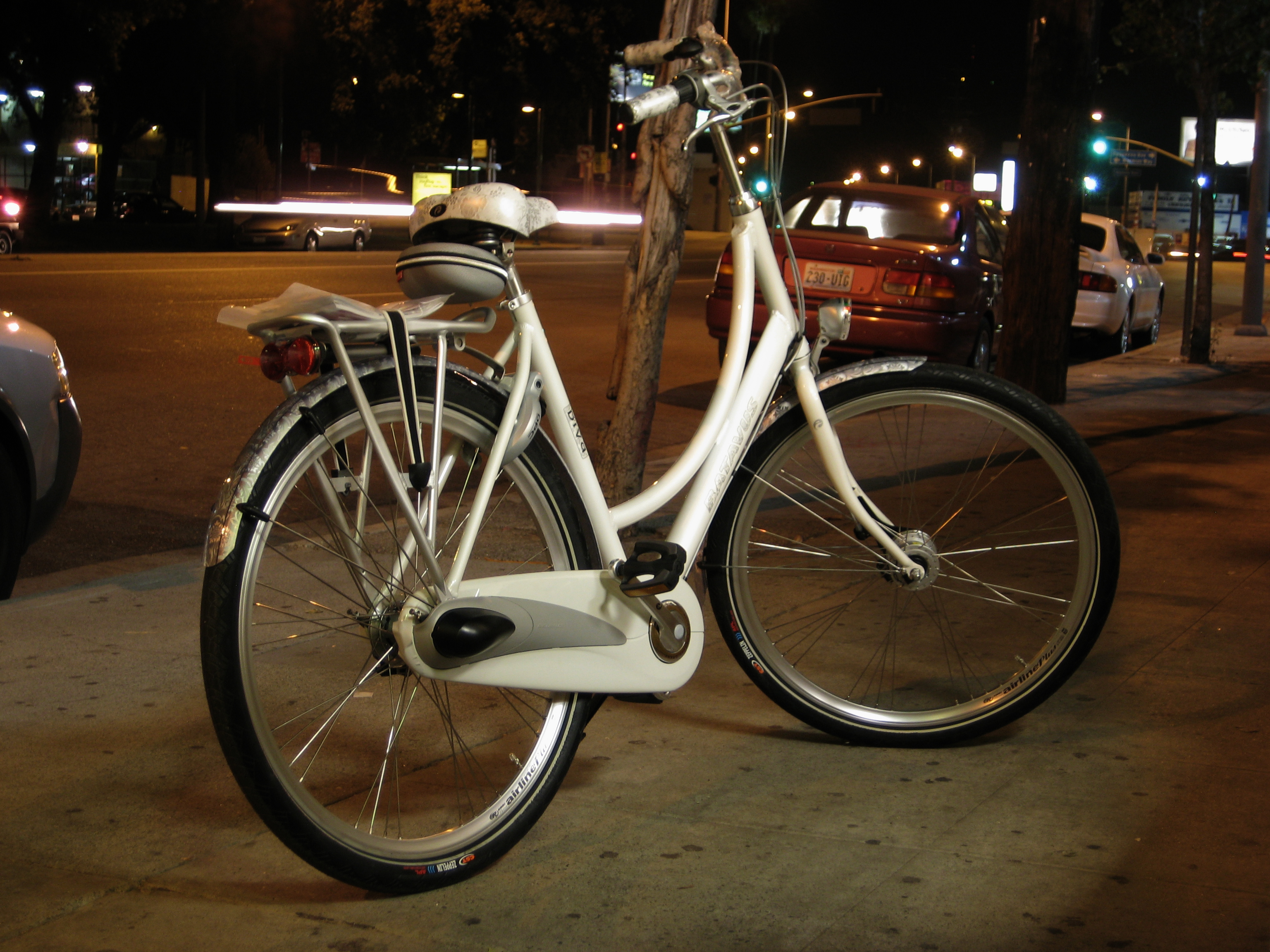
Contemporary-designed European city bicycle.

=== Suitability compared to hybrid or commuter bikes ===
The suitability and availability of fully outfitted city bikes depends on multiple factors, including local terrain, city density, car traffic, weather, and bicycle infrastructure. Traditional European city bikes are optimized for short-distance, frequent transportation over flat terrain in urban settings. However, such bikes are also used in hilly Switzerland, including Basel and Bern, where 23% and 15% of daily trips are made by bicycle respectively.

A fully outfitted European city bike or heavy utility roadster typically weighs 16–23 kg (35–50 lbs), compared with 6–10 kg (14–22 lbs) for the average road racing bike and 10–13 kg (22–29 lbs) for the typical modern mountain bike, touring bicycle, or hybrid city bike, commuter, or cross bike. A steel-frame European city bike with hub gear, chain case, and other features is heavier and more difficult to ride uphill than a road bike. A steel-frame bike is more cumbersome to carry and store, so it might not be the best choice for commuters needing to transport their bicycles on public transportation nor cyclists living or working in upper floor residences. Instead, European city bikes are often locked and stored outside businesses or residences, even during inclement weather. For easier carrying and storage, makers of European city bikes provide features similar to city bikes on folding bicycles. In the Netherlands, many modern city bikes are also available with an aluminum alloy frame, significantly reducing weight to partly overcome the practical difficulties with a heavier bike.

In the United States, Americans living in cities or suburbs with many days of sunshine per year have traditionally used road racing bicycles, sport/touring bicycles, or mountain bikes for general commuting or utility purposes. For all-weather use, U.S. buyers tend to purchase substantially lighter machines than the traditional Stadsfiets or utility roadster, instead choosing hybrid city bikes or commuter bikes derived from road or mountain designs. The latter frequently employ lightweight frames and wide gear ranges for use on higher-speed roadways as well as steep terrain. To save weight, some hybrid city or commuter bikes do not usually possess many accessories, adding only fenders, a rack, and perhaps a partial chainguard, as well as front and rear lights. Their smaller bulk and lighter weight often permits them to be carried into offices and residences, an advantage in countries with extremely high rates of bicycle vandalism and theft (even of older or obsolete models with little monetary value).

Most European city bikes are designed to withstand year-round outdoor storage, even in frigid Scandinavia where daily bike usage remains high year-round. Thus, European city bikes need not always be brought indoors and can be left outside, properly locked. To deter theft and vandalism, the European city bike has a tougher frame, non-quick-release seat and wheels, and a rear-wheel lock. To prevent theft or vandalism, it is ideal to bring the bike indoors, but this is not always possible in dense cities with compact living quarters.

=== Lightweight variants ===
Much like the English sports roadster, a lighter-weight variant of the contemporary utility bicycle adheres to the same general approach to bike design and use, but saves weight and increases efficiency by using:

- Caliper brakes instead of hub brakes
- Derailleurs rather than hub gearing
- A battery-based lighting system rather than a hub dynamo system
- Carbon front fork
- Aluminum rims and hubs, with fewer spokes
- Light plastic or webbing skirt guard, or no skirtguard
- No suspended seat or fork

The lightweight European city bike is a popular model for Dutch brands such as Batavus and Gazelle, where high levels of bicycle use result in demand for higher performance city bicycles, which is otherwise similar to the fully outfitted typical European city bike. This is sometimes marketed as a "sports" variant of the latter.

== Typical features ==
=== Angled-back handlebars ===
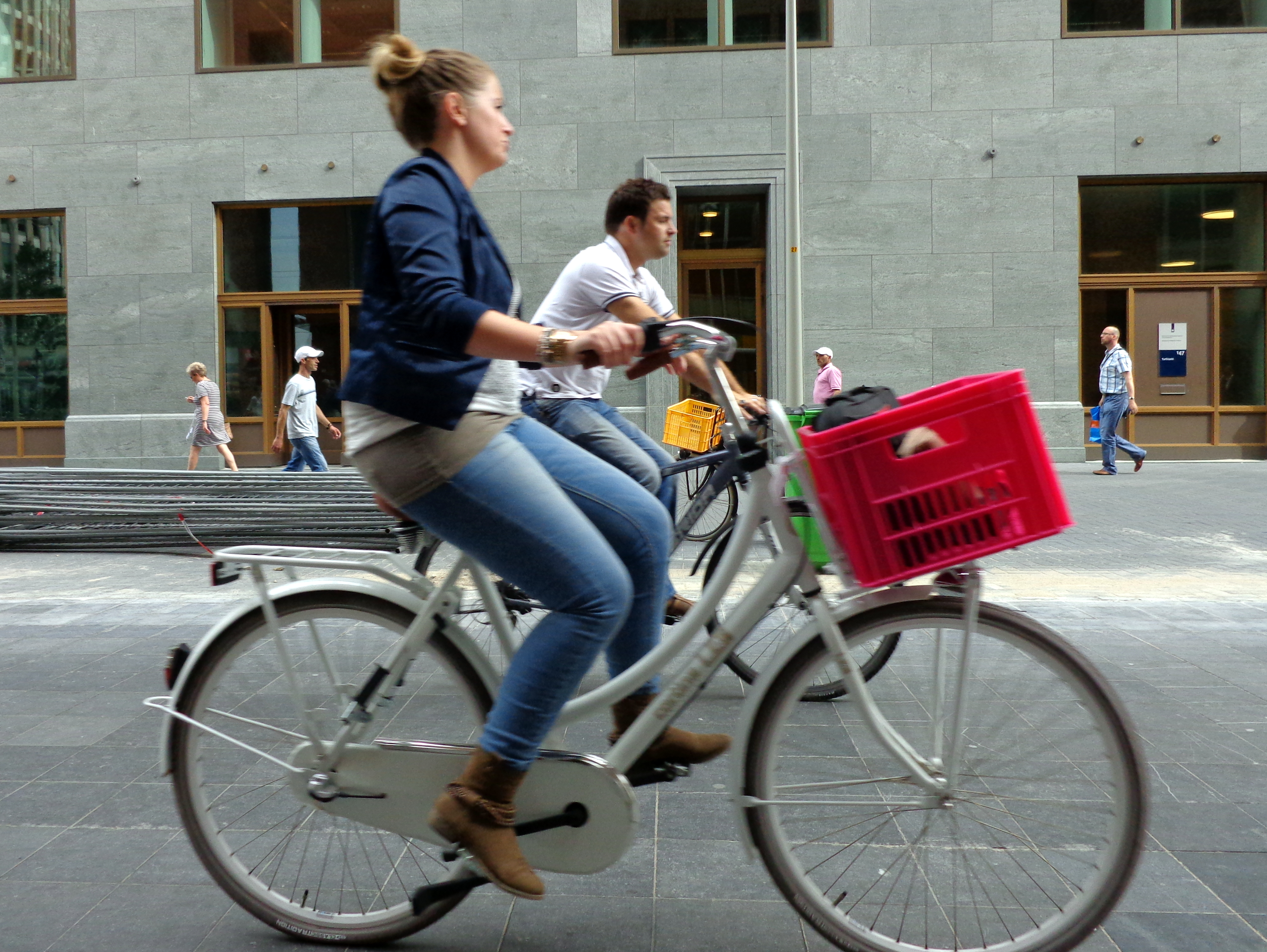
The angled-back handlebars (woman in the foreground) allow an erect sitting position increasing comfort, in contrast with straight handlebars (man in the background) which increase tensions on the lumbar area and shoulders. Red eurobox as bicycle basket.

A European city bike has angled-back handlebars and an upright riding position. The handlebars, similar to the North Road style handlebars, have a moderate rise and are swept back toward the body, enabling a fully upright posture similar to a person walking. The rider is easily visible to other traffic and can easily see traffic and hazards.

The handlebar's shape allows shopping bags, locks, and other items to be hung from the bars without slipping off. This reduces steering control, but that is compensated by the more stable geometry of the frame and forks.

=== Hub gearing ===
A hub gear is an important feature of a European city bike. A hub gear system provides greater ease-of-use than a derailleur system due to the ability to change gear stationary, smooth changes, the ability to provide a wide range of ratios, and little maintenance.

A geared hub requires only one shifter rather than two, thus is easier to use than the pair of derailleurs which provide a greater number of speeds to sporting bicycles that need them. A European city bike or roadster typically has 3, 5, 7, 8 or 11 speeds. In a few high-end models, a Rohloff 14-speed geared hub is available. Batavus makes several models of full-featured city bikes that have a NuVinci hub with continuously variable drive ratio. The NuVinci has nearly the same range as an 8-speed hub (around 300%), selectable at any ratio within the range. With most bikes, the bicycle gearing may be scaled up or down as needed, for example by installing a smaller chainring in front and/or larger sprocket in back to facilitate climbing.

Hub gearing permits the use of a fully enclosed chaincase, which minimizes the need for maintenance. A hub gear has lower efficiency than a clean, properly adjusted derailleur system, but retains its efficiency without conscientious cleaning and adjustment. A hub gear system is heavier than a derailleur system. In a hub gear system, the main moving parts are enclosed, making repair more difficult than with a derailleur system. If a geared hub fails, it is sometimes more economical to replace the hub than attempt to repair it.

=== Stable geometry ===
A curved fork and angled vertical tubing provides stable, non-twitchy steering, enabling the rider to ride with one hand, while freeing the other hand for signalling or to secure a load on the rear rack. Europeans commonly use the free hand to hold an umbrella or cell phone, or to hold the shoulder of a child riding their own bike, to train the child for positioning on the road. A coaster brake further enables such one-handed riding, because the one hand on the handlebar only has to steer, not also brake.

A stable European city bike enables securely travelling along in a position that is as upright as walking; it feels stable and relaxed, like walking very fast. A safe city bike needs to be capable of easily turning without falling over, and needs to be capable of moving reliably with shopping bags and a lock hanging from the handlebars.

=== Hub dynamo, automatic lights and magnetic lights ===
A hub dynamo enables a built-in lighting system without the loud noise and high drag of a bottle (sidewall) dynamo, and without the unreliability, high cost, ecological disposal problem, and maintenance inherent with batteries. The hub dynamo powers LED or halogen front and rear lights. The lights have a built-in reflector. The taillight is mounted cleanly on the rear rack or fender. A built-in reflector in the headlight and taillight surrounds or is adjacent to the LED or light bulb. Built-in lights stay on point, i.e., need no adjustment.

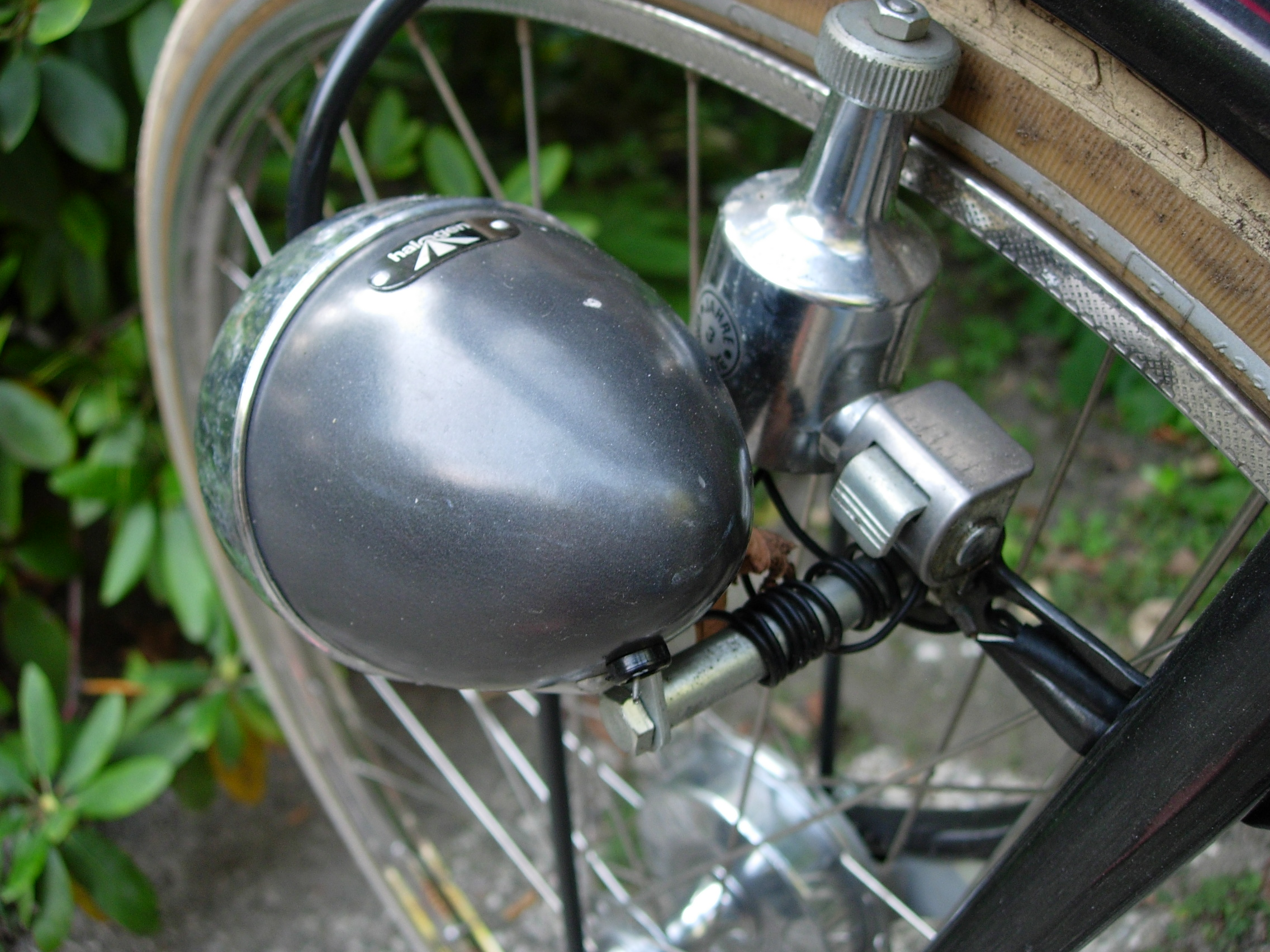
Traditional bottle dynamo and lamp

The latest systems include a capacitor-powered standlight, powered for a few minutes by a capacitor. This prevents the lights from going out as soon as the bike speed drops to less than a few kilometers per hour; this evens out the amount of light at various speeds, sustaining the light at lower speeds.

The latest systems include automatic switching based on darkness+motion detection. This prevents having to reach to physically position a bottle dynamo or consume set-up time; this enables ready, guaranteed lighting regardless of the daylight conditions. A three-position switch has positions for Off, On, and Auto. A hub dynamo prevents the usage-overhead and preparation time of attaching the headlight and taillight to the bike prior to using the bike, and prevents having to remove the headlight and taillight and carry them while the bicycle is parked in public. A built-in light system avoids a failing battery lamp and prevents getting a ticket and fine from having no lights at night.

Many Danish bikes feature lights powered through electromagnetic induction. The lights are mounted on the bike wheels, eliminating the need for batteries while incurring less resistance to the rider than traditional dynamos.

=== Front suspension with built-in headlight ===
A front suspension fork is common on high-end, contemporary-styled European city bikes. This is often a coil/oil or air/oil suspension fork with adjustable compression and rebound. A traditional roadster has no front suspension, or a spring-based front suspension that has more limited travel and adjustability.

Some high-end models integrate the headlight into the front fork and fender assembly. This discourages vandalism, protects the wiring, and reduces the number of external wires and cables.

=== Ring lock ===
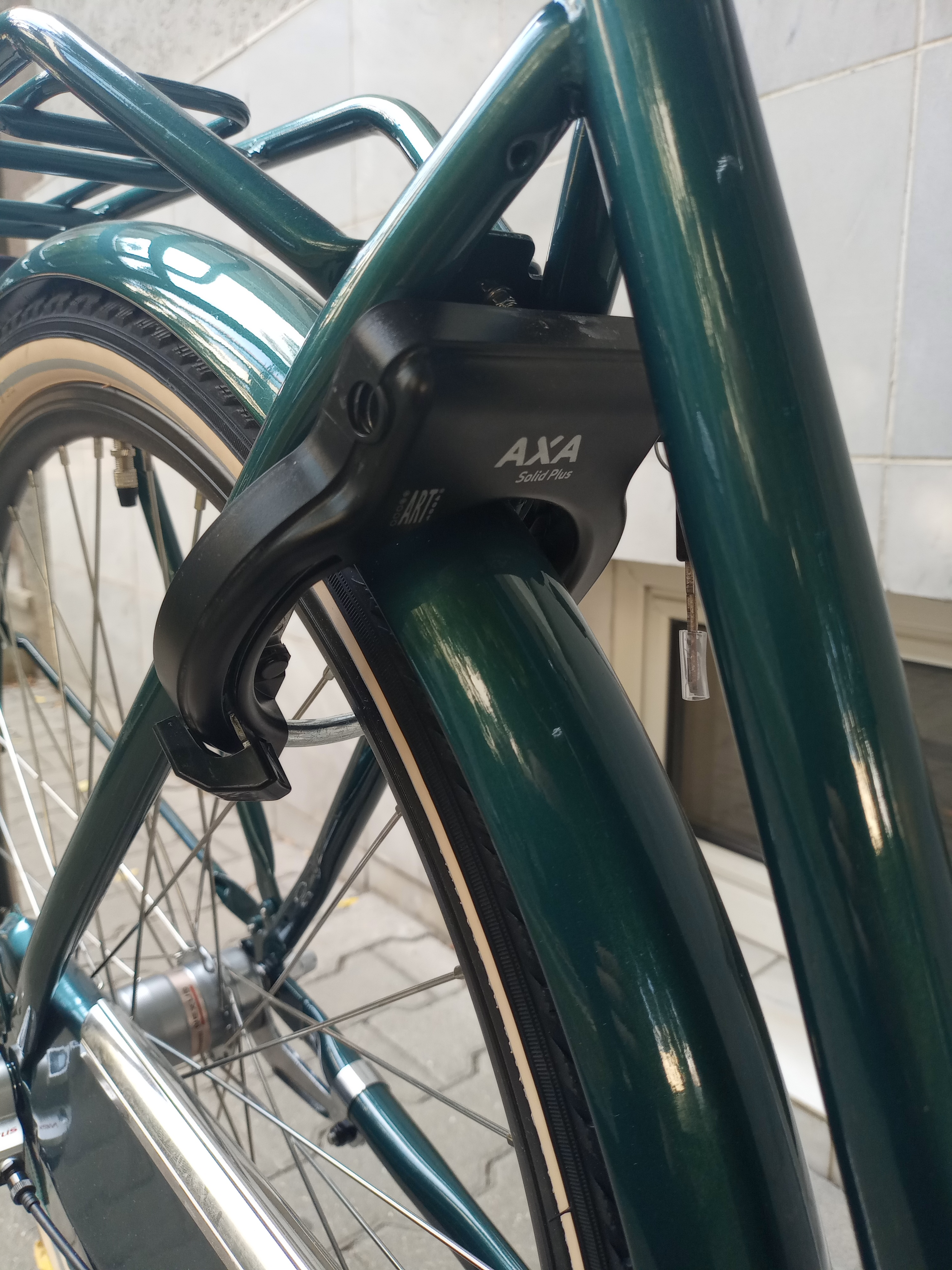
Bike ring lock

A built-in ring lock is a type of bicycle lock that prevents ride-off theft, establishes ownership, secures the back wheel to the frame (which can be separately locked), and provides a lock and slot for a cable. A ring lock is also called a wheel lock or an O-lock.

The ring lock facilitates outdoor parking, by reducing the risk that someone can steal the bike by quickly riding off on it. A ring lock is lightweight and unobtrusive. It can be locked very quickly and conveniently, such as when parking the bike outside a store while running errands.

The ring lock also serves as a deterrent to ownership disputes, as the person who has the O-lock key is proven to be the owner of the bike. More recent ring locks have a slot to attach a chain or a cable, allowing a cyclist to lock the frame, wheels, and seat.

Ring locks provide a limited degree of security, like all locks. The greatest security requires using multiple types of locks together. In the Netherlands, Copenhagen and Japan, the ring lock is generally used alone; the bikes are insured against theft and the owner must show that they have the key, to demonstrate that the bike was locked. The key can only be removed by locking the lock. In other locations, the ring lock is used along with locking the frame to a secure object, or the ring lock is used alone when the owner is very close by, to prevent ride-off theft.

=== Skirt guard ===
A skirt guard (or coatguard) allows using the bike with normal clothes, for both the main rider and a passenger riding on the back rack. The skirt guard helps enable riding in cold and rain because it allows easy use of a coat, cloak, dress, skirt, scarf, or luggage; winter biking becomes possible in conjunction with wearing more clothing and using a skirtguard and chaincase. It also enables transporting various materials on the rack without getting caught in the spokes.

A skirtguard prevents winter or flowing spring clothing from getting caught in the area where many features converge: the back brake, O-lock, and spokes. The skirtguard and O-lock form an integrated system. The O-lock catches clothing, so the skirtguard is needed to compensate. The O-lock passes through a hole in the skirt guard. The traditional, old-fashioned city bike has a solid (opaque) fabric skirt guard, while the contemporary European city bike has a clear plastic guard.

=== Fully enclosed chain guard ===
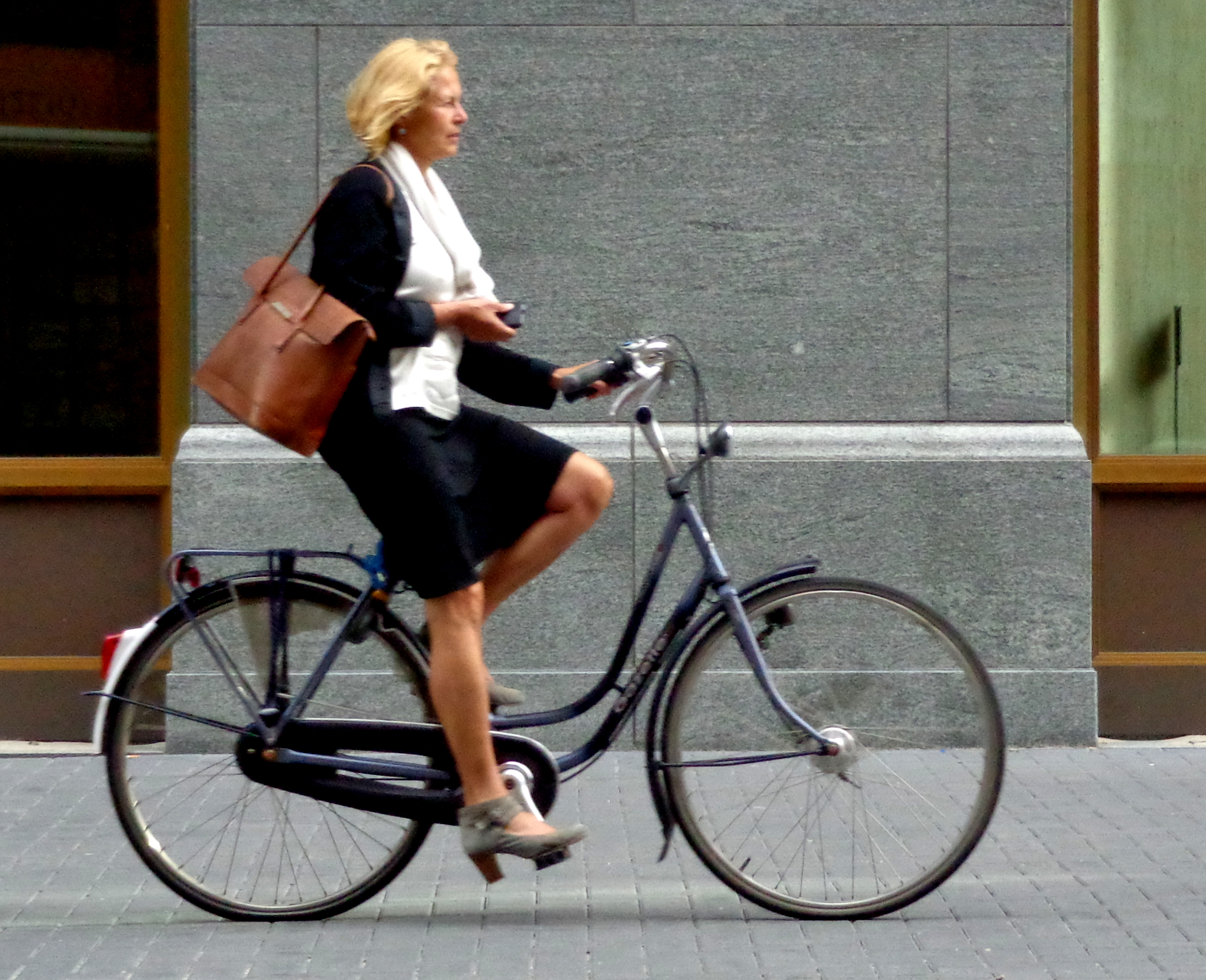
Riding in a skirt on a bicycle with fully enclosed chain guard keeps mud off clothes and maintenance to a minimum.

A fully enclosed chain guard and mudguards protect against oil or dirt. Chaincase enables using the bike with normal clothes and no preparation activity, such as wearing trouser clips or rolling up a trouser leg. A full guard prevents oil stains on clothes, and keeps trouser legs from getting caught in the chain or front chainring. While newer designs may use a partial chain guard, the latter still permits the chain to occasionally catch and stain loose trouser legs if not secured.

A full chain guard also keeps the drive train (chain and external gears) clean and efficient by excluding water, mud, and grit which can otherwise splash onto the chain and front chainring, increase wear, and reduce drivetrain efficiency. To repair a rear flat tire, a fully enclosed chain guard must be partially disassembled to remove the back wheel, or the tire must be repaired in-place without removing the wheel.

=== Full fenders with mudguard flaps ===
The fenders are aluminium or plastic, sometimes with a taillight affixed to the bottom of the back fender. The fairly low bottom of the back fender reduces road grime splashing up to a cyclist who is following behind. Integrated fenders designed into the bike provide a clean, safe attachment, and match the bike frame.

=== Enclosed drum brakes ===
Enclosed drum brakes or a rear coaster brake are used on most European city bikes, rather than rim brakes. A bike with drum brakes is optimized for stopping in wet weather: in wet weather, drum brakes provide more stopping power and reliability than rim brakes; but in dry weather, less.

Enclosed drum brakes require infrequent maintenance, compared to rim brakes or disc brakes, and are more durable than disc brakes, which are exposed.

Drum brakes are best suited for slower, moderate use, rather than longer periods of hard downhill braking while carrying a load. Under such heavy braking, drum brakes are reported to sometimes fade, losing stopping power, while rim brakes can overheat the rim and cause a tire blowout. A common model of drum brake is the Shimano Rollerbrake, which includes a mechanism to prevent the drum brake from suddenly catching and grabbing more than intended.

Drum brakes are heavier than rim brakes.

=== Luggage carrier ===
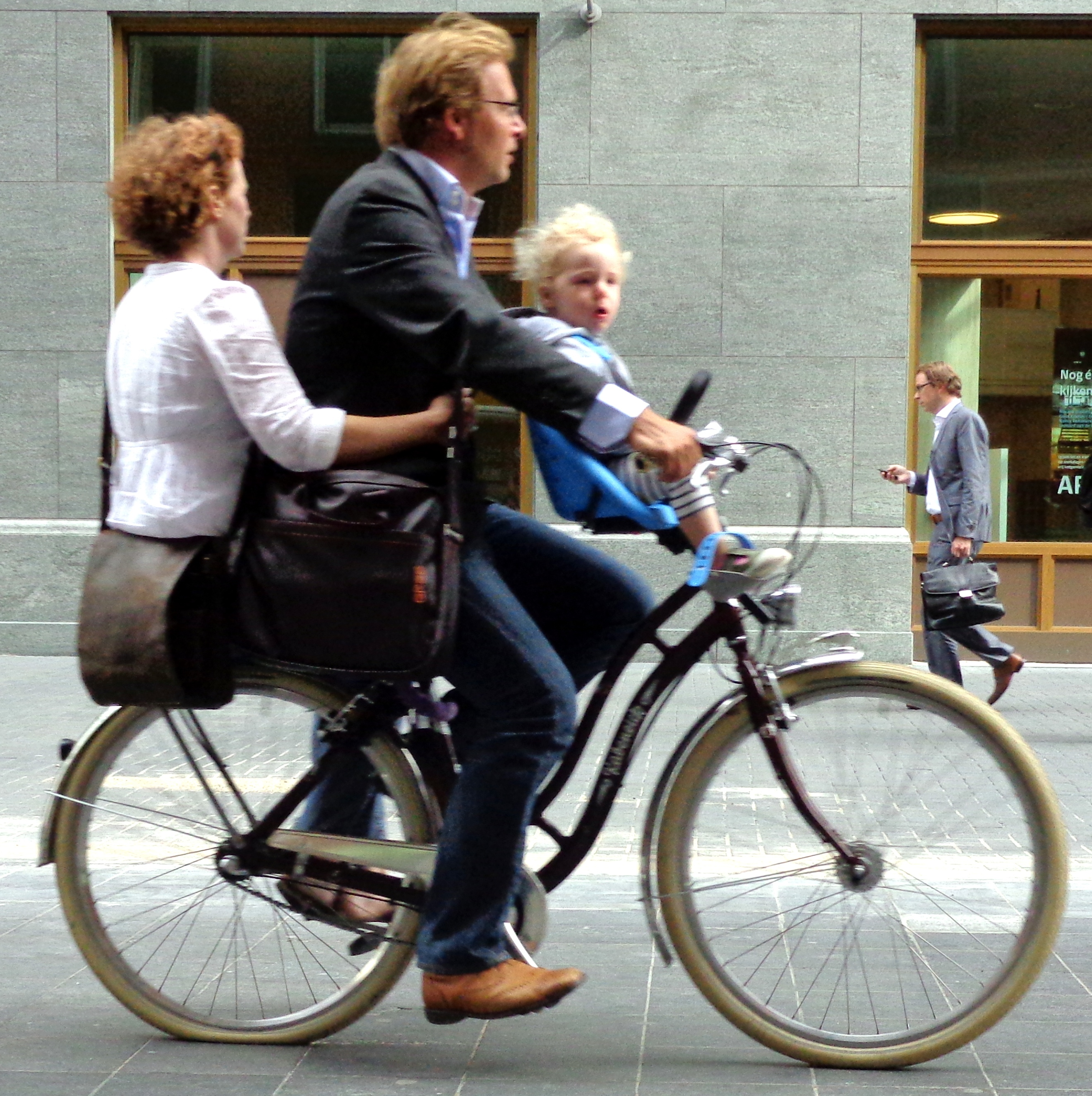
Transporting a passenger on the back rack, and a child above the handlebar.

A Dutch convention is to carry a passenger on the back rack, the passenger balancing side-saddle. The sturdy rack supports passenger weight, to carry a passenger and sustain a launch without collapsing. A standard strap assembly attaches cleanly to the rack, providing useful transport capability. There are standard notches for a strap assembly with 2 to 4 elastic straps. The rack is integrated into the bike design; the taillight is usually mounted on the back of the rack.

Danish bikes are usually equipped with a back rack with a spring-loaded clamp.

=== Tires and wheels ===
Tires are puncture-resistant for travelling without a pump and tools to fix a flat tire. Width is normally medium to wide 38 to 44 mm (1.5 to 1.7 in), providing a balance of speed with durability and cushioning. These are semi-slick road tires with shallow tread, such as Schwalbe Marathon tires. Such tires are faster and quieter than mountain-bike tires, and more durable and reliable than road-racing tires. Reflective bands on the sidewalls make the wheels visible as wheels, not just as small reflectors. This makes the bike more visible from side at night by cars without using reflective clothing and extra lights.

Large 710 mm (28 in) 700 B or 700 C wheels are typical, providing a smoother ride than 660 mm (26 in) wheels. On traditional Dutch city bikes, extremely thick spokes add carrying strength. To discourage theft, the front and back wheels use axle bolts instead of quick-releases. European city bikes are used in bike-friendly areas for short distances with sturdy tires. These features are suited to riding without tools or quick-release wheels.

=== Platform pedals ===
The platform pedals allow use with normal shoes.

=== Saddle ===
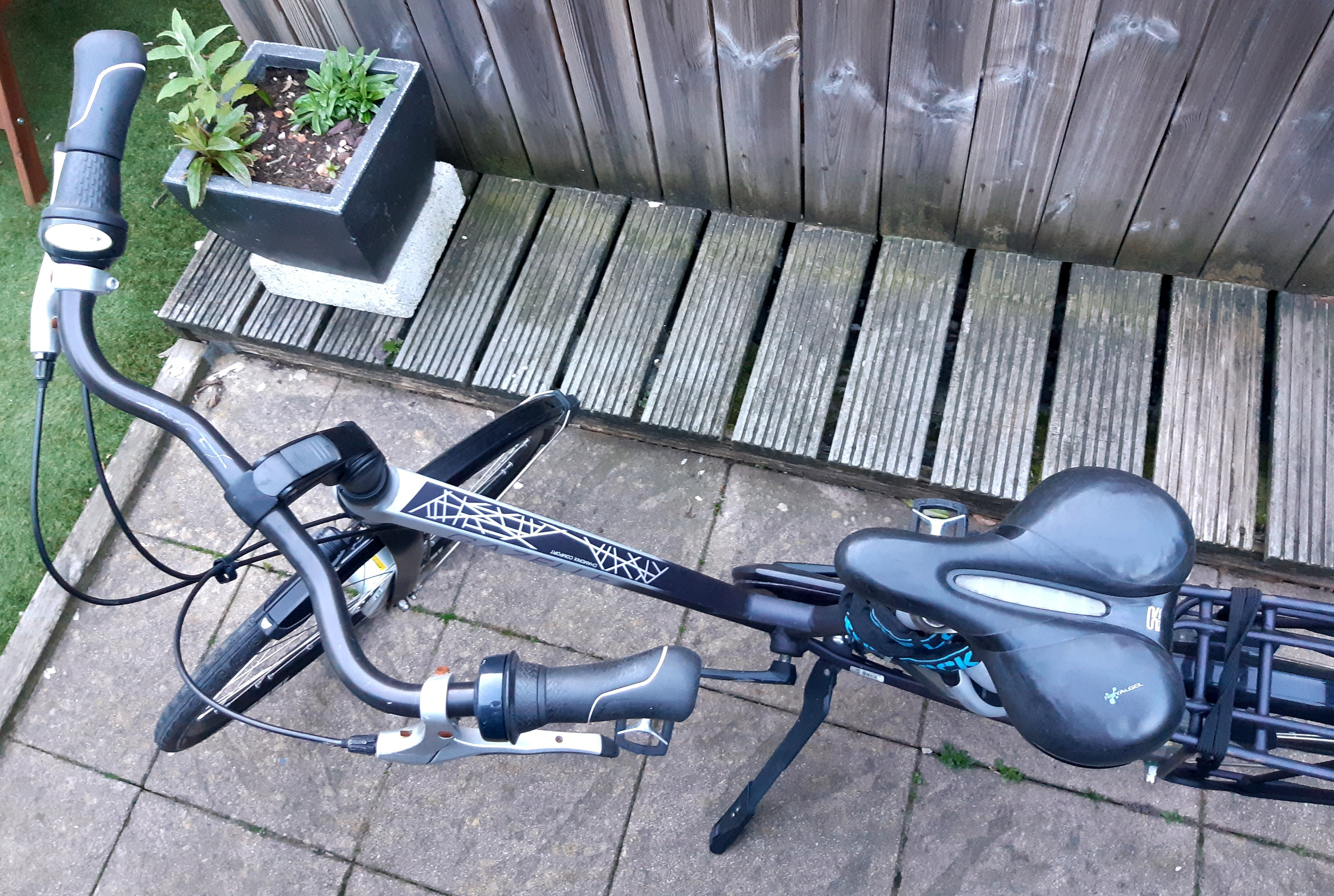
City bicycle viewed from above, particularly (from right to left) the large saddle with a perineal slot, the single lateral kickstand and the angled-back handlebars

The saddle is typically moderately broad, softly cushioned, and is often suspended. A non-quick-release seat prevents having to lock or remove the seat to prevent theft. These features allow an increase in comfort considering the erect position. Some saddles further have a longitudinal slot, to avoid perineal pressure. In addition to avoiding perineal pressure these anatomical slots preclude bone pressure pain and saddle sores.

=== Single, dual or adjustable kickstand ===
A kickstand is present, and is often dual-leg or a center-stand for stability while the bike is carrying children or a load. Alternately, an adjustable-length kickstand enables parking regardless of the slope and load. A kickstand allows a bicycle to stand in any flat or slope surface without the need of an external stand or support.

=== Other features ===
A bell is standard equipment for bikes in Europe, and is required by law in some European countries, such as Denmark, Poland and Germany. Additional features are available, such as front and rear bicycle reflectors, baskets, child seats and a windshield.

== Media and politics ==
In 1997, then President of the United States Bill Clinton was given a European city bike named City Bike One as a memento of his visit to Copenhagen, Denmark.

== Types and manufacturers ==
=== Types ===
Other examples of utility bicycles for commuting, errands, delivery and general urban transport.

- Roadster or "Dutch bicycle"
- Small wheel bicycle
- Folding bicycle
- Cargo bike
- Porteur bicycle
- Hybrid bicycle

=== Manufacturers ===
The following bicycles provide most or all of the features are commonly found in The Netherlands or Denmark on a city bike:

- Batavus, Crescendo model
- Gazelle
- Kronan
- Skeppshult (bicycle) Skeppshult
- Sparta, "Atlas Trendy N7" model
- Kildemoes, "Classic" model
- Taarnby, "City Shopper" model
- Flying Pigeon, PA-02 (men's), PA-06 (men's double top tube), and PB-13 (women's) models, made in China
- Trek Bicycle Corporation, L300 model and other "City/Trekking/Leisure" models.
- Motobecane USA "Bistro 3", "Bistro 7" and "Bistro 8" model
- Windsor "Essex" and "Oxford" model
- World Bicycle Relief, Buffalo Bicycle

While differing in many details, some American bicycle manufacturers have incorporated some features of traditional European city bikes in models such as:

- Windsor USA features the "Essex" and "Oxford" model, men's and women's models
- Motobecane Bistro 8 features quilted stitching on saddle and grips along with an 8 speed internal hub
- Electra Royal 8, Breezer Uptown 8, Biria Trekking Superlight 8, and the PUBLIC C7i

== See also ==
- Bicycle messenger
- Cargo bicycle
- Electric bike
- Outline of cycling
