= Pashley Cycles =

British pedalcycle manufacturer

- Industry: Cycle manufacture
- Founded: 1926; 100 years ago
- Founder: William 'Rath' Pashley
- Headquarters: Stratford-upon-Avon, England
- Key people: Adrian Williams
- Products: Bicycles (including workbikes) and tricycles
- Revenue: 40% of product is exported to around 50 countries
- Number of employees: 50
- Website: www.pashley.co.uk

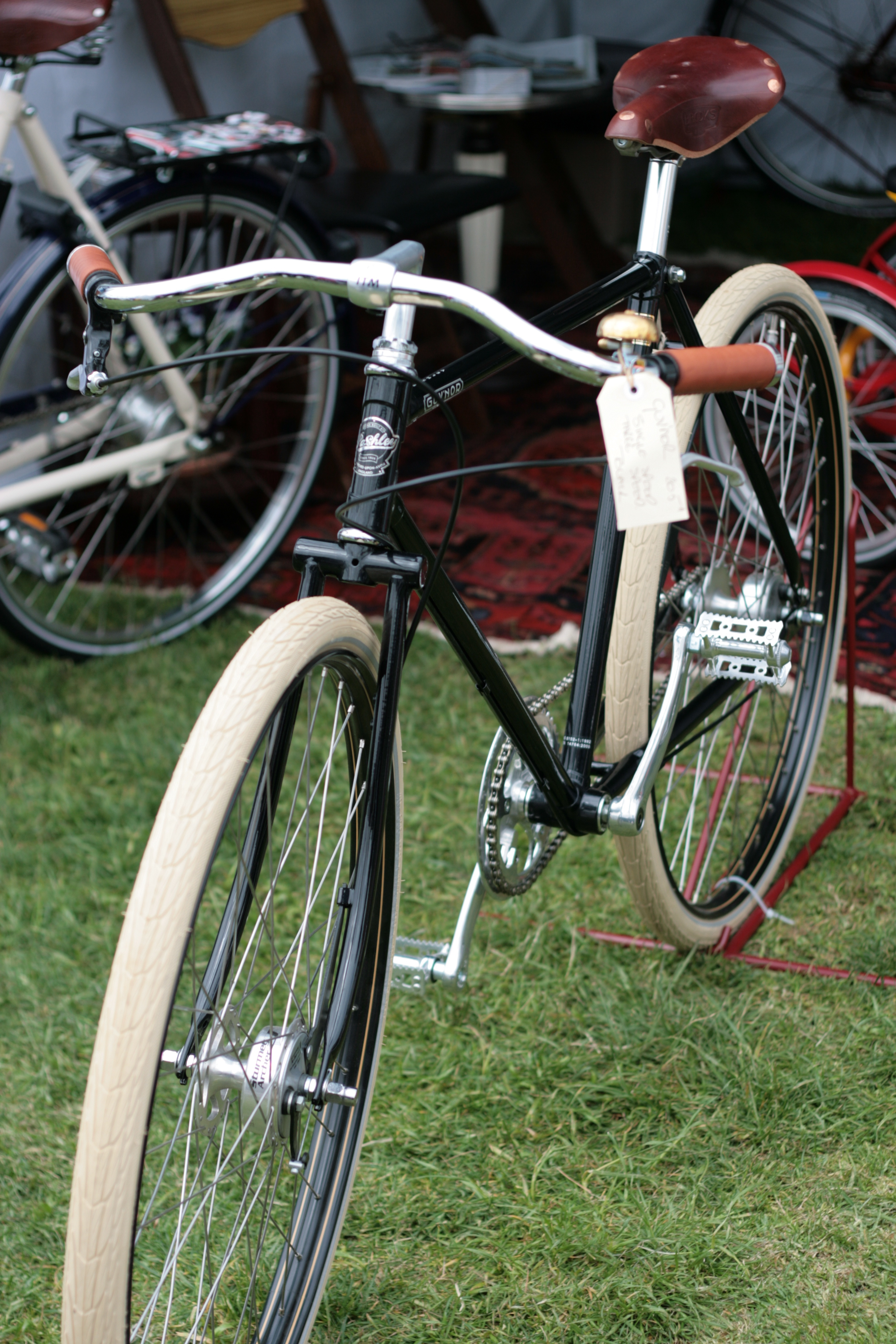
The Pashley Guv'nor

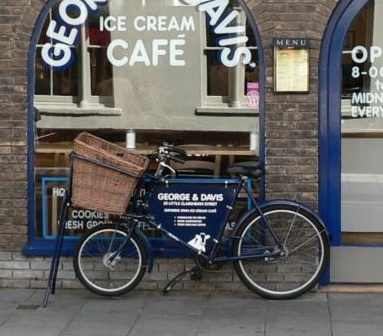
Pashley Delibike

Pashley Cycles is a British bicycle, tricycle and workbike manufacturer based in Stratford-upon-Avon in Warwickshire, England. The company was started in 1926 and still manufactures bikes in the UK.

== Formation and early years ==
In 1926, William Rathbone 'Rath' Pashley founded Pashley and Barber in New John Street West, Birmingham. Pashley and Barber declared that they were 'Manufacturers of every type of cycle' and that 'Birmingham produces the finest cycles, these are Birmingham's best'. The model range included everyday roadsters, clubman racing machines, tradesmen's carrier cycles and tandems. Rath had been apprenticed to the Austin Motor Company before the First World War and saw military service as a despatch rider. These occupations in his early years gave him engineering knowledge and skill and also a lifelong interest in two wheel transport.

Competition in the cycle trade was very fierce and after a short while 'Rath' Pashley realised that success would come through identifying a market niche. A new company, Pashley Carrier Cycles, was formed to concentrate on building carrier cycles designed to withstand the abuse thrown at them by errand boys.

In 1936, the company was incorporated as W.R. Pashley Ltd and moved to a larger new factory (over 30,000 square feet) in Chester Street, Aston. As prosperity returned after the depression, the company increasingly focused on delivery and vending tricycles - for dairy products, ice cream and general deliveries.

In the 1930s, Pashley made almost every component of their cycles in their own factory - for the frames, only the tubing and lugs were bought in. Frame building, brakes, wheels, sheet metal work, polishing and enamelling were all carried out in the works.

== War years ==
During the Second World War, Pashley, like many other engineering firms, turned some of its production capacity over to the war effort. Pashley's manufacturing capability proved to be of considerable value and the company produced Browning machine gun mounts among other equipment.

== Post war ==
In the years following the war, carrier cycles were still in high demand but it was the continuation of the supply of larger tricycles, and the infant development of the motor car for the mass market, that received most of Pashley's attention. Having made motor rickshaws in the late 1940s, Pashley started the manufacture of Brockhouse Indian Motor Tricycles in 1950 - J. Brockhouse and Co. of Birmingham having acquired the Indian Motorcycle Company of Massachusetts and sub-contracted the manufacture to Pashley. These had a conventional delta tricycle layout (two wheels at the back), similar to the Pashley Pelican motorised rickshaw - with seats for up to four passengers - and the driver. Pashley were the first company to fit hydraulic brakes to what was, technically, a motorcycle. This innovation may have been influenced by Rath's younger son, John Pashley, who worked at Girling. The prototype Pelican Rickshaw has been returned to the company and awaits restoration.

Pashley also moved briefly into car manufacture in 1953, again with a conventional tricycle layout. Perhaps the most successful of the motorised Pashley tricycles was the '3cwt Light Delivery Truck' with a Kendrick wheel layout. This meant a tadpole tricycle configuration with two wheels at the front, giving the driver a view of both the loadspace and the overall vehicle width, useful for manoeuvering in tight spaces.

As more conventional motorised transport became available to most businesses in the early 1960s, Pashley's focus moved away from motorised vehicles and, together with the carrier cycles, trolleys, carts and street barrows, a large number of road trailers were manufactured, both as simple chassis and fully bodied.

== The 1960s and a production move ==
The 1960s was a pivotal era for Pashley. Rath's son, Dick, took control of the company on his father's retirement. Dick had recently moved to Stratford-upon-Avon, and took the bold decision to move the company from Aston to brand new premises on Masons Road, Stratford. Production Manager John Kerby began working for the company in 1968 and remains with Pashley to this day.

With the advent of small wheel bicycles, pioneered by Alex Moulton in 1962, Dick Pashley developed a simple 'shopping' tricycle, now known as the Pashley Picador. Many thousands of these have been sold since, users benefiting from the stability and low step-through frame. Its all welded construction was very unusual for the cycle industry at the time, and many years passed before other manufacturers adopted it. A similar two-wheeled shopping bicycle, the Piccolo, was also manufactured.

As traditional roadster bicycles began being removed from the ranges of other British manufacturers, Pashley decided to focus on classic roadsters. Some companies sold rebadged Pashley Roadsters in the 1980s and 1990s. These were built to the original 1920s design. For many years, versions of these saw service in large numbers under the patronage of UNICEF. Pashley still make a traditional roadster bicycle and it is still in demand in UK and export markets.

== Pashley carrier cycles and the Royal Mail ==
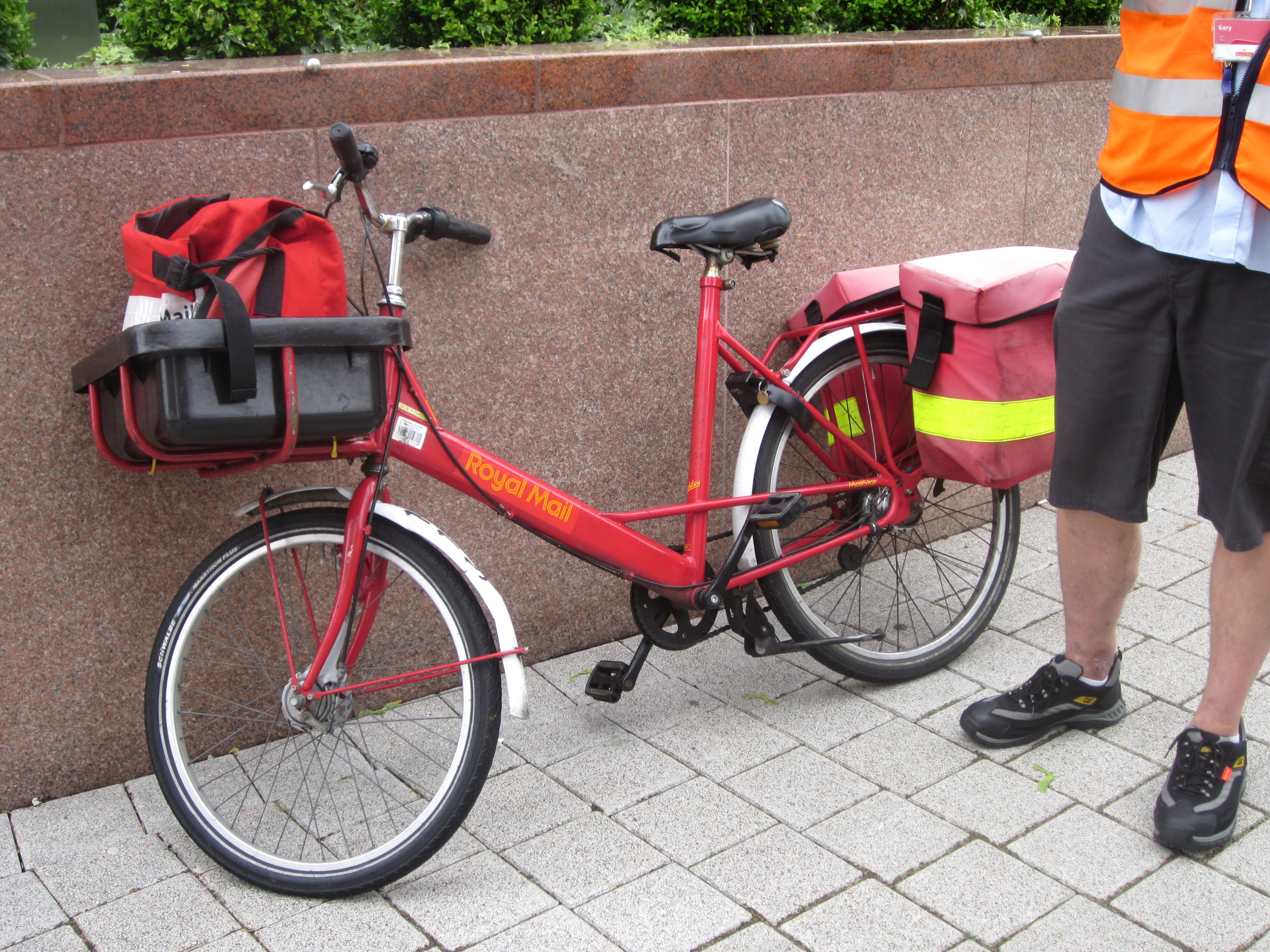
Pashley Mailstar in 2011

Since inception Pashley has provided carrier cycles to industry and commerce. One of the early, equal-wheel carrier cycles Pashley sold in the 1930s (the 'Model L' for £7.10.0) had a front metal tubular carrier and nameplate in a similar manner to the 'Courier' that the company sells currently. This led on to motorised delivery tricycles and the manufacture of ice-cream carts, railway station platform refreshment trolleys and specialist units for the dairy and catering trades. The company continues to make ice cream vending tricycles (Classic No. 33) alongside its other workbike products.

In 1974, Pashley acquired Gundle, the only other surviving manufacturer of carrier cycles. This cemented their position in the market for this type of bike. For many years Gundle models were built alongside the Pashley range, before being absorbed into the Pashley RH range. The RH range was named after Rath's local public house - 'The Robin Hood' in Hall Green. Pashley also made 'SW' (Small Wheel) bikes and does so today under the name 'Delibike' (see above image).

By the late 1970s, Pashley was supplying bikes to the Royal Mail. The original Royal Mail designed mail delivery cycle was single speed and equipped with rod operated brakes. Pashley was one of a small number of UK manufacturers (including Townsends Cycles) to produce this bike and in the 1990s became the sole supplier. During the mid-1990s. Pashley proposed interim upgrades to the 1992 Royal Mail design which resulted in the 'Millenium' model. This had wider tyres, reliable drum brakes and for the first time provided postal delivery staff with 3 gears.

Entering the 21st century, Pashley was faced with international competition for the supply of Royal Mail bicycles. For the first time, Royal Mail required the supplier to design the bicycle as well as manufacture it. Pashley had been developing a new load carrying bicycle called the 'Pronto' which by employing a step-through frame design would allow mail and goods to be safely carried both at the front and the rear of the cycle. This was put forward to the Royal Mail. Three suppliers from the original eight European tendering companies were shortlisted and a year-long test programme started. This involved 180 bicycles from the three manufacturers. Eventually the Pronto was chosen. The Royal Mail named it the 'Mailstar' and deliveries began in 2001. Pashley continues to supply the Royal Mail although vans and trolleys are replacing much of the bike fleet. Under its original name of Pronto, the bikes are still used for all types of deliveries by other companies in the UK and abroad.

In 2010, Royal Mail announced it would be retiring its fleet of bicycles, with the CEO at the time, Adam Crozier, making the decision due to safety concerns. In response, cycling charity CTC launched its "Keep Posties Cycling" campaign, hoping to convince the new CEO at the time, Moya Greene, to reverse the decision. The use of bicycles by Royal Mail was phased out completely by 2014.

Many refurbished Pashley Mailstars were sent to Africa by charities such as Re-Cycle and Krizevac Project. Krizevac Project refurbished 5,000 bikes in the UK, which were then sold as "Elephant Bikes", with every Elephant Bike sold paying for another to be sent to Malawi.

== Product development, acquisitions and mergers ==
Pashley launched the 'Pickle' children's tricycle in 1981. It was closely modelled on children's tricycles of the 1950s and featured proper ball bearing hubs, headset, bottom bracket and pedals. This made it better to ride and more resilient than cheaper competitors. Pashley tandems made a re-appearance in the late 1970s with the introduction of the 'Tourmaster'. These were constructed along simpler lines than conventional tandems, and, like the Picador, used a lugless construction. As a result, they were inexpensive and popular.

In 1984, Pashley launched what was to be its last 'all British' bike - the 'Patriot'. This was a conventional sports light roadster design with all the components sourced from the UK. Some components became unavailable and the Patriot name was later used on a 24-inch wheel hire bike.

For much of the 1990s, Pashley were producing one, two and three-wheeled cycles. Unicycles were an interesting side-line for the company and as well as standard and tall ('Giraffe') models Pashley created the UMX (BMX type) and the 'Muni' (Mountain Unicycle). This particular model was successful at off-road cycling events and the term Muni became a generic term for off-road unicycles thereafter.

In late 1994, the Pashley family relinquished control to the employees in a management buyout led by Adrian Williams, an aeronautical engineer.

Pashley Special Products was set up to develop and market new models. The first of these was the 'Tube Rider'. It was modelled on the war-time Paratrooper's bicycle with twin curved tubed frame. The 'Paramount' followed, using the same frame but fitted out with racks, mudguard and chainguard for city and commuting use. Pashley also worked with Land Rover to make an off-road model called 'XCB' with hydraulic disk brakes and suspension forks.

At the end of 1997, Pashley absorbed Cresswell Cycles, a manufacturer of folding bikes and specialist trailer trikes. Production of these was transferred to Stratford-upon Avon.

During 1998, the 'TV Series' range of bikes was introduced. Pashley had a number of Trial and Trails riders in its employ: Matt and Eddie Tongue, Tim Stedman, Kye and Toby Forte and Dylan Clayton. A range of frames were made from Reynolds tubing to tackle this specialist form of extreme riding.

In the late 1990s and 2000s, Sturmey-Archer and its subsidiary Brooks Saddles were sold and briefly fell into the hands of receivers. Sturmey-Archer was acquired by Sun-Race of Taiwan. Pashley shareholders acquired Brooks at this time and working with Brooks employees, updated the branding and set a new course in the production of "fine leather saddles and accessories".

== Pashley and Moulton ==
In 1991, Pashley agreed to manufacture the new small-wheeled, full suspension Moulton 'All Purpose Bicycle' or 'APB' as it was more commonly known. This brought all the features of the 'AM' series to the mass market. The 'APB 12' and 'APB '5' were launched in the spring of 1992. In 1995, a licensing deal with Land Rover resulted in the launch of a versatile, durable variant of the Moulton APB called the 'Land Rover APB', which sold to Land Rover and Moulton enthusiasts.

== Pashley to the present day ==
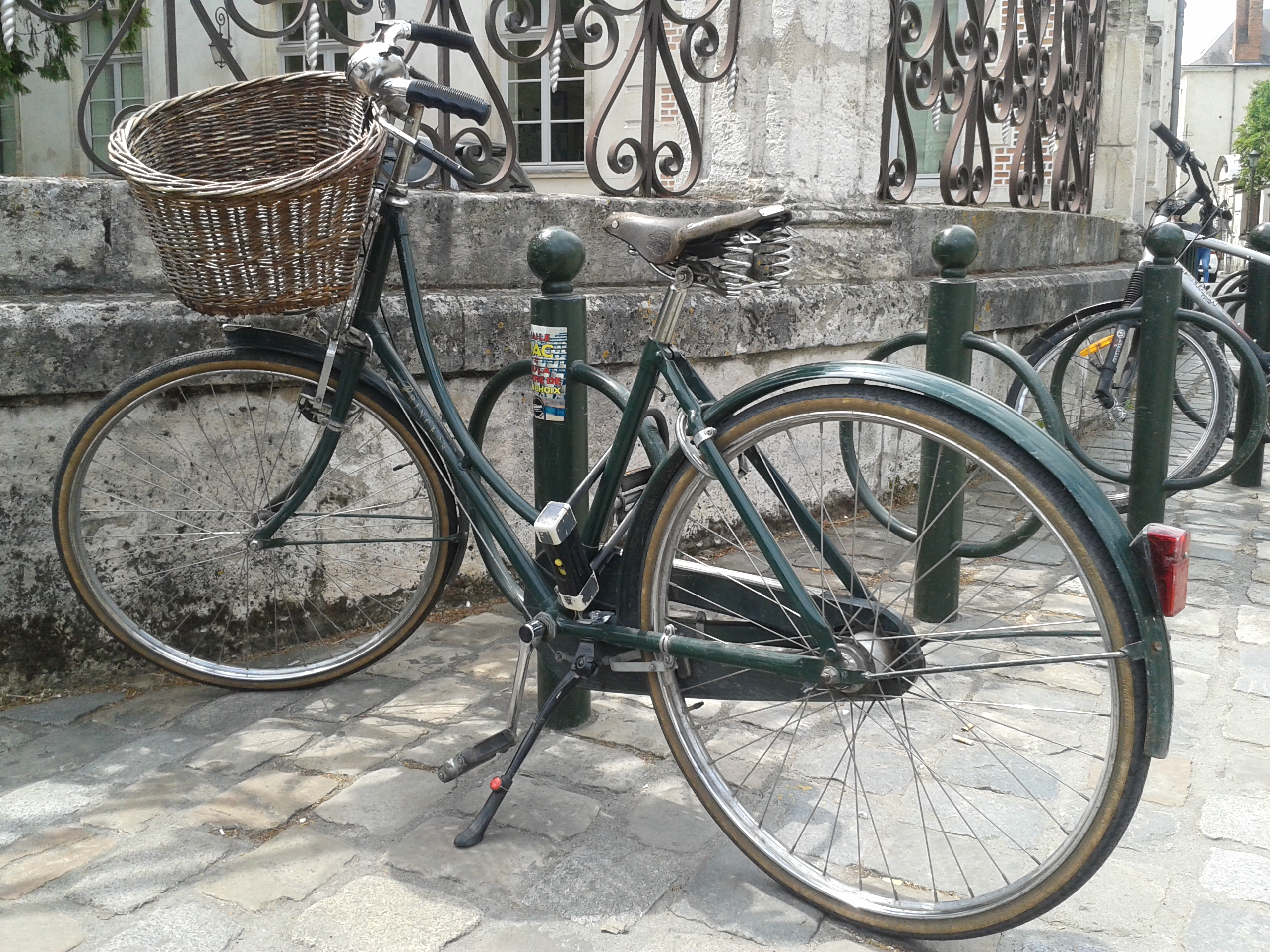
Pashley Princess with front wicker basket and Brooks leather saddle.

Pashley produces a women's 'Princess' traditional loop framed bicycle with front wicker basket and Brooks leather saddle, and a men's 'Roadster'. The bike has large 28-inch wheels with its 635mm Westwood rims and 'sit up and beg' riding position. In 2007, the company launched the 'Guv'nor' which was inspired by an original Pashley catalogue from the 1930s. They persuaded Reynolds to re-introduce 531 tubing. More recently Pashley has launched its 'Clubman' range, with frames made with 531.

Pashley manufacture a range of carrier cycles and tricycles that are used commercially by companies in the UK and abroad.

In November 2023, Pashley opened a crowdfunding campaign, inviting its customers fund future development. The company said the funding would support existing product development in e-cargo delivery cycles, electric assist leisure cycles, and bike share products for public and private hire schemes.

== See also ==
- List of bicycle manufacturing companies
