= Sohrab Cycles =

Pakistani bicycle company

Sohrab
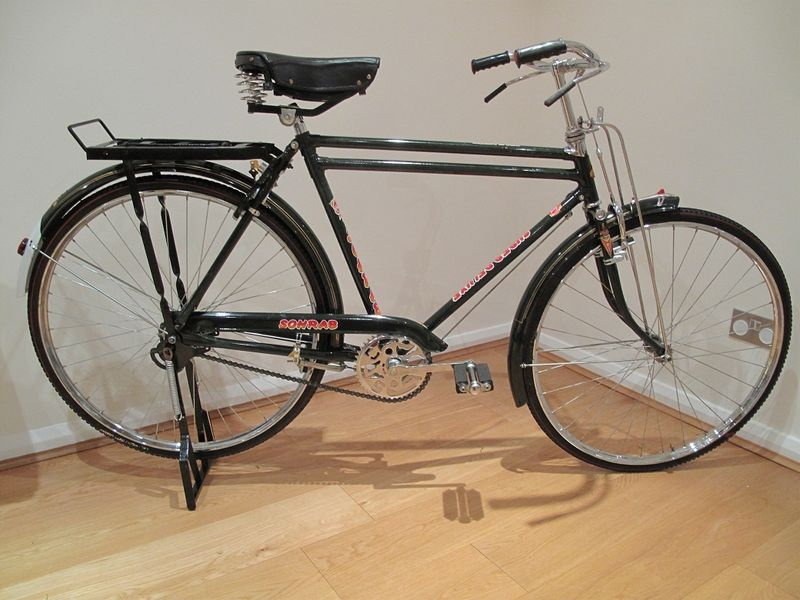
- 2012 Sohrab Roadster
- Native name: Urdu: سُہراب
- Romanized name: Sohrāb
- Type: Private
- Industry: Bicycle manufacturing
- Founded: 1952; 74 years ago
- Headquarters: Lahore, Pakistan
- Area served: Pakistan; Bangladesh; Afghanistan
- Owner: Pakistan Cycle Industrial Co-Operative Society Limited
- Website: sohrab-cycles.com/products_bicycles.php

Sohrab (Urdu: سُہراب) was a Pakistani bicycle manufacturer based in Lahore.

== History ==
Sohrab began in 1952 with a core of traders in Lahore, following a foreign exchange crisis which severely restricted imports in Pakistan. The traders saw an opportunity to domestically produce and sell bicycles, and consequently founded Sohrab on 8 September 1953 under Section 9 of the Co-operative Societies Act II of 1912. It initially had 22 members and produced 5 bicycles a day.

== Structure ==
Sohrab was set up keeping its workers in mind. All controlling powers of the company laid with the general body, who were elected into power every three years. Since its inception, elections were held on a regular basis. Sohrab provided subsidized workers canteen and company hospital. It also paid for five of its workers to attend the Hajj pilgrimage in Mecca each year.

== Products ==
Sohrab initially manufactured a single-speed roadster bicycle. This had a lugged steel frame and rod-brakes. More modern MTB and BMX style bicycles were added to the range in the 1990s. Sohrab also diversified into producing cargo-tricycles, gymnasium equipment, push-chairs and wheelchairs. In 1994, Sohrab entered the motorcycle market with the JS70. A larger version of this was later used as the basis for an auto-rickshaw.

Sohrab's primary market was in mainly remote and rural population areas of Pakistan. It also exported cycles to Afghanistan and Bangladesh and wheelchairs to Madagascar through a French rotary club.
