= Moulton Bicycle =

English bicycle manufacturer

Moulton Bicycle Company
- Moulton Bicycle Company logo
- Type: Private
- Industry: Manufacturing
- Founded: 1958 in Bradford on Avon, England
- Founder: Alex Moulton
- Headquarters: Bradford on Avon, Wiltshire
- Products: Bicycles and cycling accessories
- Website: Official website

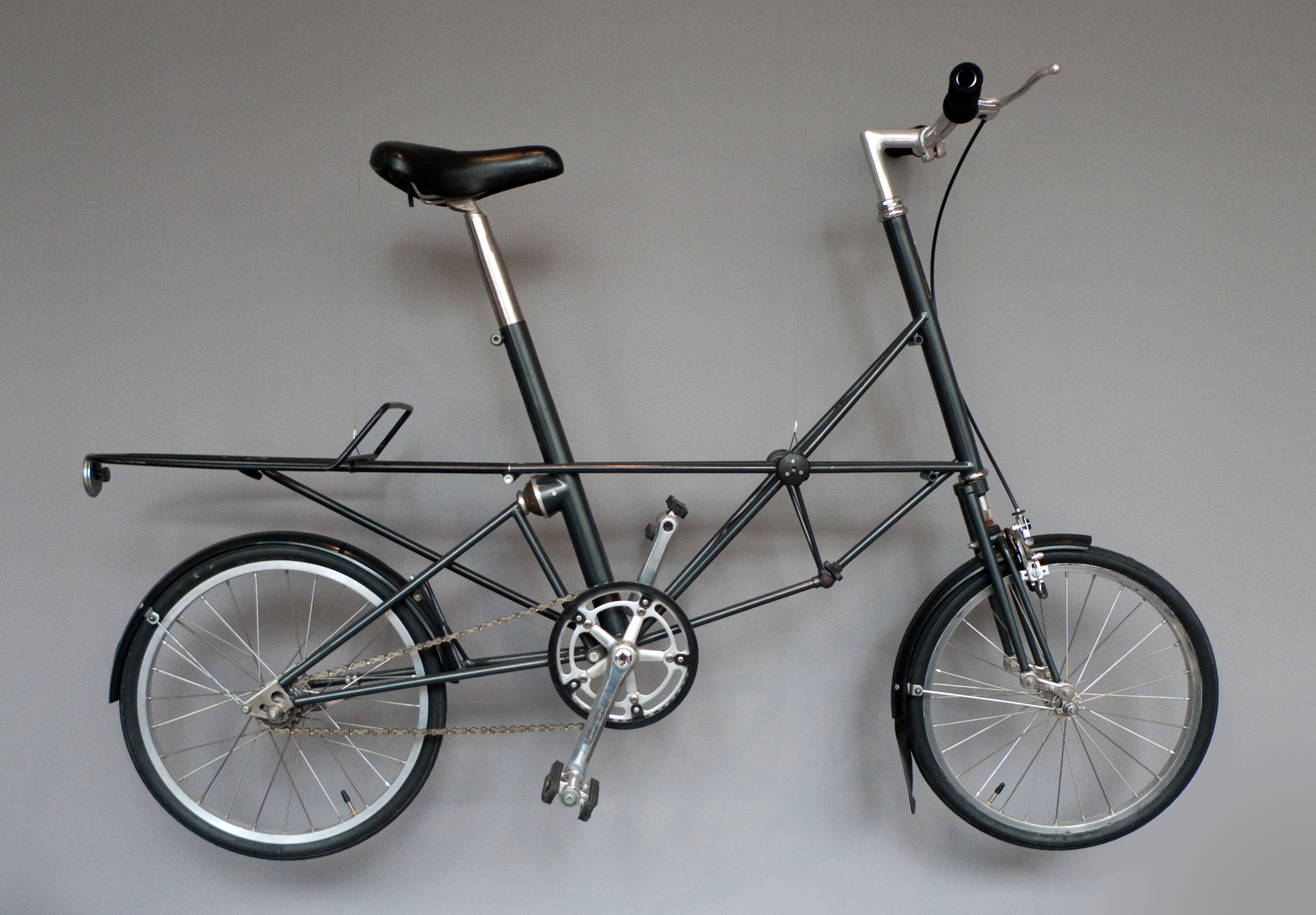
The Moulton space frame in the New York Museum of Modern Art

Moulton is an English bicycle manufacturer based in Bradford-on-Avon, Wiltshire. The company was founded in 1962 by Alex Moulton (1920–2012) who had designed the "Hydrolastic" and rubber cone suspension systems for the BMC Mini motorcar. Moulton bicycles are noted for unconventional frame design, small wheels, and front and rear suspension.

Mass-appeal versions such as the Standard and Deluxe were complemented by Speed versions used in competition.

In August 2008, Alex Moulton announced the creation of a new company called Moulton Bicycle, in collaboration with British bicycle manufacturer Pashley Cycles which had manufactured certain Moulton designs under licence since 1992.

== History ==
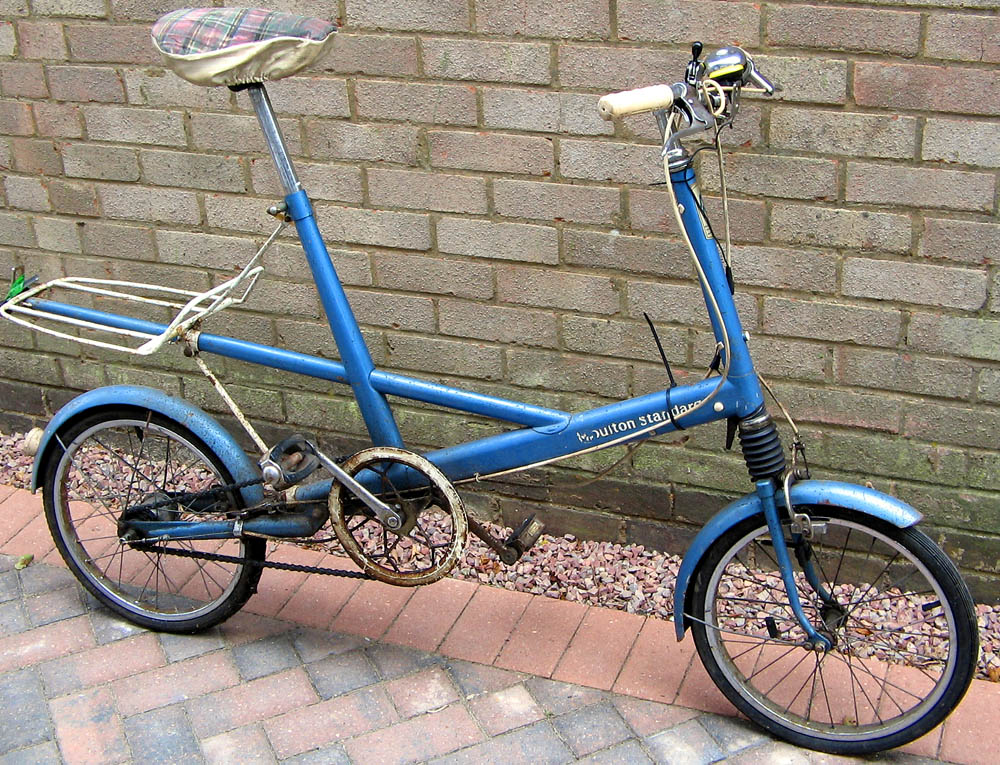
A 1965/66 Moulton 'New Look' Standard M1

In the late 1950s, disillusioned with the design of the classic bicycle, Alex Moulton set about creating a new design. He thought the classic diamond frame was inconvenient to mount, difficult to adjust for size and not suitable for both sexes, and that 'Ladies' open frame bicycles without the top tube of the diamond frame were structurally compromised for ease of use. He believed that classic bicycles (especially with small frames and smaller wheels known as 'shopper' bicycles) were uncomfortable to ride without the use of wide, low-pressure tyres which increased rolling resistance. He also thought large wheels made a bicycle slow and cumbersome to store, and did not easily fit emerging societal commuting patterns in the developed world, which often combined more than one form of transport.

Moulton considered that small wheels with high-pressure tyres would result in less rolling resistance, less inertia and hence greater acceleration. He then went on to develop a range of high-pressure tyres in co-operation with Dunlop. Suspension for the front and rear was developed to give a comfortable ride with the smaller wheels. In this respect, the Moulton bicycle was ahead of its time, as bicycle suspension would not become common for another 30 years.

The Moulton bicycle also featured a different frame from the traditional diamond design. It is often known as an F-frame or Lazy F due to its unusual structure. The F-frame had no top tube, as such, and could therefore be easily mounted by those with mobility limitations, whether imposed by physical infirmity or by type of clothing.

=== Impact ===
When the design was released in 1962, it was one of the first major innovations in bicycle design since the "safety bicycle" in the 1880s and made an immediate impact. The 1962 version (aka "bicycle of the future") was the first production Moulton bicycle with suspension and the racing version was televised the same year, ridden by road race champion and Moulton employee John Ronald Tovey. Moulton bicycles were sold around the world by the thousand and Moulton was one of the largest bicycle manufacturers in Britain. The architecture and design critic Peter Reyner Banham, known for often controversial views on technology and industrialisation, was an advocate and user of the original Moulton. Eleanor Bron's 1978 book Life and Other Punctures celebrates travels around France on an original Moulton.

=== Models ===
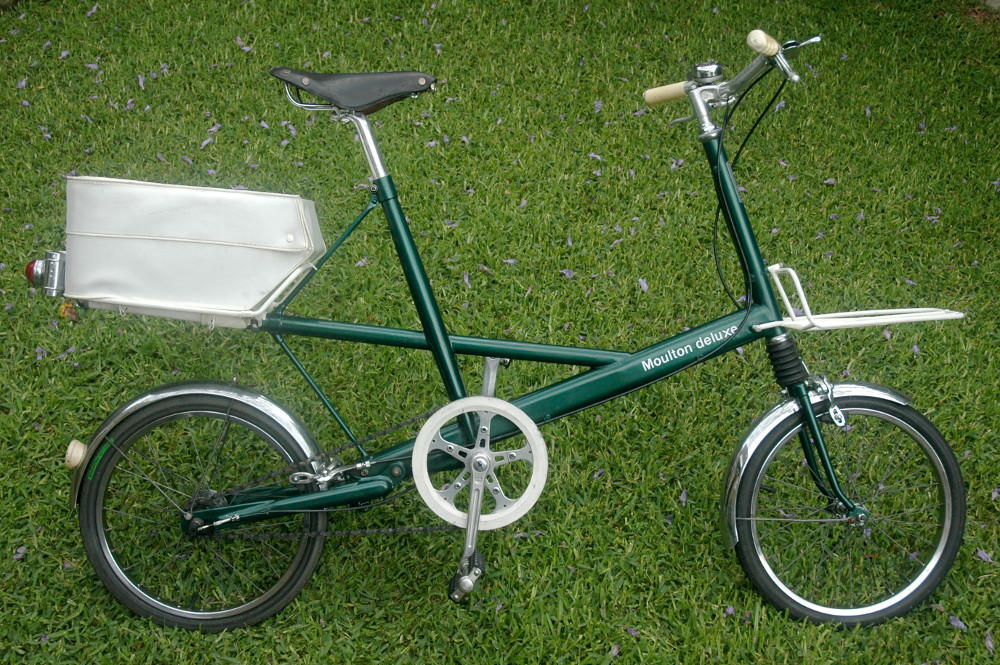
1965 Moulton Deluxe M2

The following home-market models were produced between 1962 and 1967 in the Moulton factory at Bradford-on-Avon and in the BMC car factory at Kirkby, Liverpool: Continental and Automatic M0, Standard M1, Deluxe M2, Safari M3, Speed M4, Stowaway M5 and the Speedsix M6. A further low volume, high specification 'S' range of Moulton bicycles was produced separately at another small workshop in Bradford-on-Avon and consisted of the Deluxe MS2, Safari MS3, Stowaway MS5 and the top-of-the-range 'S' Speed. After the Raleigh take-over in 1967, the models were just the Major and Major Deluxe, which in turn were dropped with the introduction of the Mark III in 1970.

=== Acquisition by Raleigh ===
A drop in sales brought the company into financial difficulties, and in August 1967 it was taken over by Raleigh. Raleigh produced the Major, Major Deluxe and the Mark III (previous Moultons were known as Series 1 and Series 2). In 1974, production stopped.

=== Rebirth ===
In the early 1980s, Alex Moulton bought back the rights to the Moulton design from Raleigh, and brought out a design along broadly similar lines to the original. Aimed at the high end of the market, this AM series has a space frame allowing high rigidity and low weight when compared to traditional steel frames. In 1998, the New Series Moulton was introduced. This, similar to the AM, incorporates a Flexitor front suspension, and a rear suspension based on the unified rear triangle principle. The New Series includes the Pylon and Double Pylon high-performance models: in the latter all large diameter tubes have been eliminated, resulting in a pure space frame design and low weight.

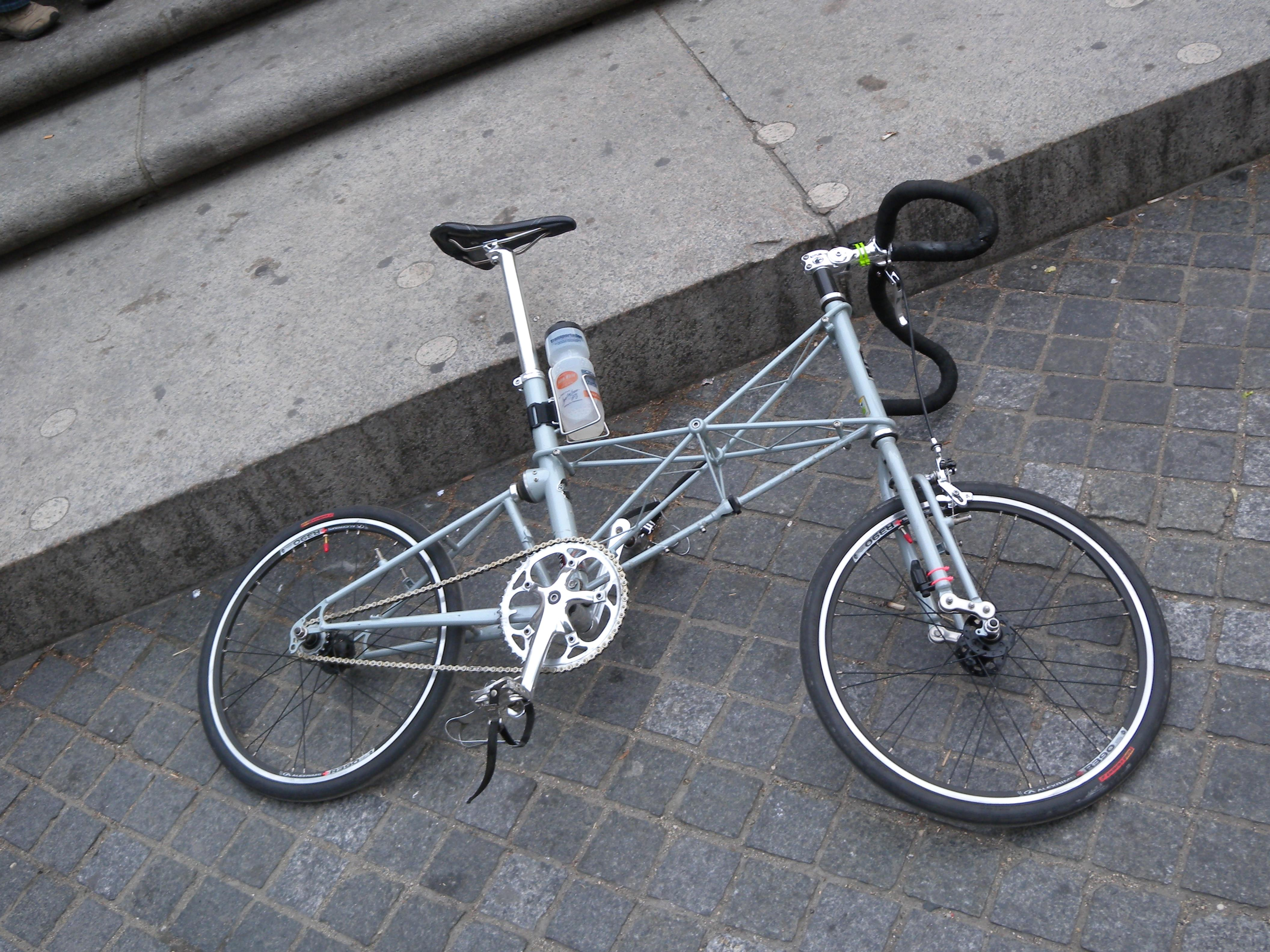
A Moulton in 2010

=== Pashley-Moulton ===
A cheaper variant of the AM bicycle design, the APB (All-Purpose Bicycle), was produced under licence by Pashley Cycles from 1992 to 2005. To reduce costs, Pashley use off-the-shelf components as far as possible instead of the custom components of the original Moultons: for example, specially manufactured 17 by 1 1/4 inch (ISO 369) wheels, tyres, and inner tubes were replaced by the more common 20-inch ETRTO 406 size.

In 2005, the Pashley-Moulton design was updated to create the TSR series: high-performance, lighter versions of the Pashley-Moulton replacing the APB. In 2008 the TSR became the Moulton TSR when Alex Moulton Bicycles and Pashley Cycles combined to form a new company, The Moulton Bicycle Company. Production of the Moulton TSR by Pashley in Stratford-on-Avon continues today. In 2022, Moulton acquired the original Moulton Bicycle Works in Bradford-on-Avon, with the intention to make all Moulton products there. Since the start of 2023 the Moulton TSR has been made in Bradford-on-Avon.

=== Bridgestone Moulton ===
A newer model, stylistically and structurally similar to the original Moulton design, was manufactured from 2000 by Bridgestone. Known as the Bridgestone Moulton, it was built in Japan and those sold in the UK were assembled in England at the Moulton factory. Like the original Moulton, the AM, and the APB before it, it was available in separable and rigid performance versions but is no longer manufactured. Though similar in appearance to the original design, it was a contemporary performance bicycle with advanced design and components.

=== Moulton Bicycle Company ===
As of October 2026, the Moulton Bicycle Company listed several models at prices ranging from £2,150 for TSR models to £25,857 for the flagship New Series Double Pylon.

== See also ==
- List of bicycle brands and manufacturing companies
- Me and My Moulton (2014 film)
