= Hetchins =

Bicycle frame brand

- Industry: Cycling
- Founded: 1922
- Founder: Hyman Hetchin
- Website: hetchins.com

Hetchin's, originally Hetchin's Lightweight Cycle Specialists, simplified to Hetchin's Lightweights since 1993, is a brand of bicycle frame. It takes its name from the founder of the firm, Hyman Hetchin.

== History ==
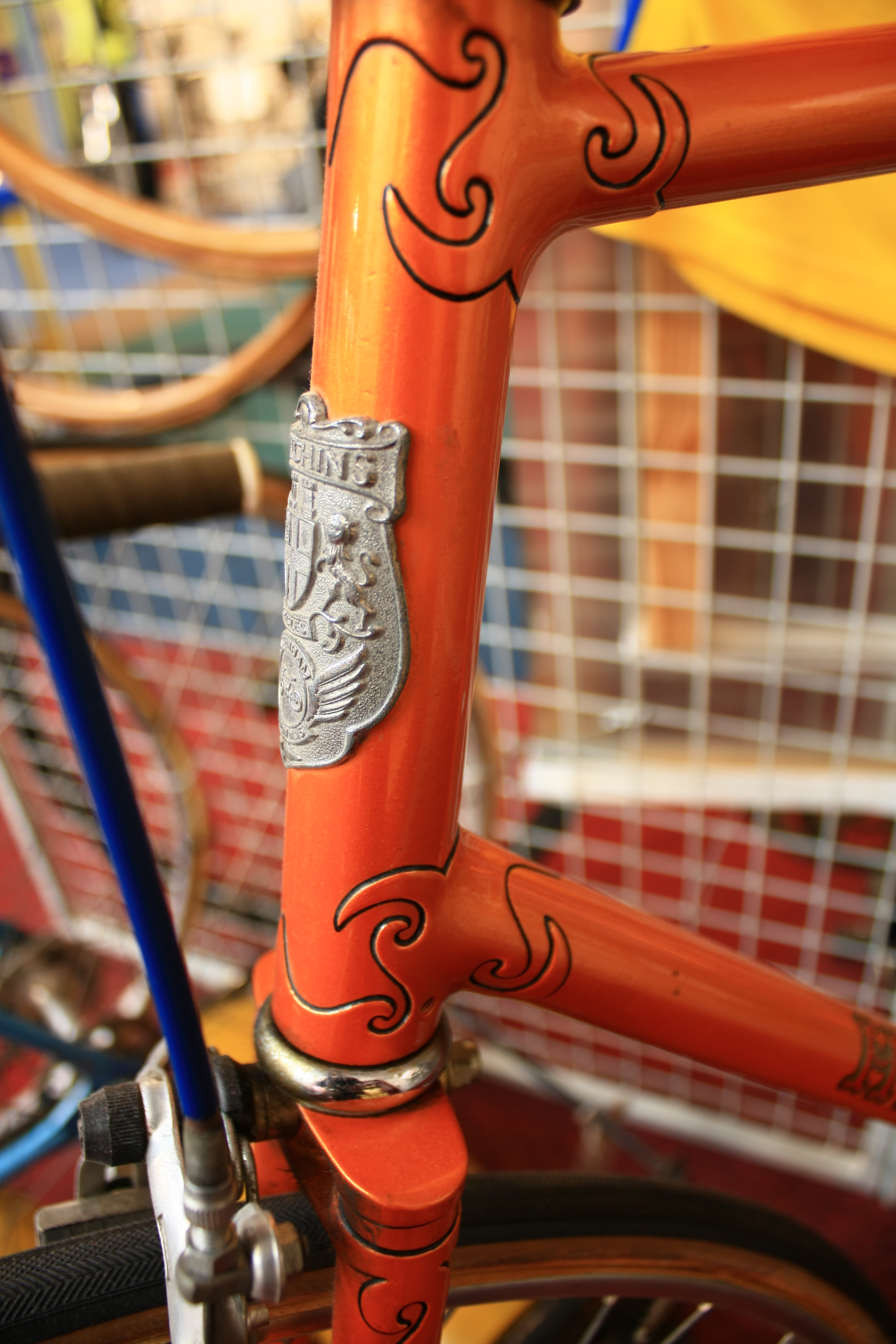
The distinctive lugwork of a Hetchin's headtube

Hyman Hetchin was a Russian Jew who fled the Bolshevik revolution around 1917 and settled in Britain. By 1922, Hetchin had opened a shop in Seven Sisters Road, Tottenham, North London, selling household appliances including gramophones, sheet music, shellac 78 rpm records, and, later, bicycles. (Note: Hilary Stone has researched this in Kelly's Street Directories 1914 – 1934.) (Note: John Liffen has verified this in the rates books and electoral register.)

At first Hetchin resold mass-produced bicycles, including Raleigh and Rudge.

Jack Denny was a London frame builder who had a shop at 194 Wandsworth Road, not far from Seven Sisters Road. Denny had experimented with an innovative design involving curved stays; Hetchin recognized the marketing potential of the design, partnered with Denny, and patented the design in 1934. From then on, Hetchin stopped re-selling other bicycle marques, and produced and sold only his own.

The partnership soon brought rewards in the form of Olympic and World's Championship victories in 1936. Sales were strong thereafter, reaching a pre-war peak of over 600 frames in 1938 and 500 in 1939. The war years saw production fall to below 200 frames per year; sales did not recover until 1953. These are remarkable figures for a shop which consisted of one man who took care of sales and marketing (Hyman Hetchin) and one frame builder (Jack Denny). In the 1950s, additional help was recruited, consisting of part-time lug cutters (including Ken Janes) and frame builders (chiefly Bob Stratfull and Stan Broom). The partnership endured past Hyman's death in 1961, when Hyman's son Alfred ('Alf') took over the business.

Apart from the patented curly (or "vibrant") stays, Hetchin's frames were (and still are) known for ornate, and often hand-cut, lugwork. Other design innovations are attributed to Hetchin/Denny, such as a fluted seat tube on six-day racers (this brings the rear wheel closer to the seat tube than on conventional bicycle frames, shortening the wheelbase). Hetchin supported many racers and racing teams, especially track and six-day contestants, over the years.

In 1974, the shop moved to Southend-On-Sea (forced, due to re-zoning of the Tottenham property). Alf continued to manage the business until his retirement in 1986, when he sold the shop to a London businessman. For a short time, Hetchin's and Bob Jackson Cycles (Leeds) were fused, but the two marques separated in 1993. Since 1993, the Hetchin's operation has been centered in Preston (UK) under the management of David Miller; the current frame builder is Paul Riley.

Hetchin's Lightweights continues to produce bespoke lugged-steel bicycle frames. Approximately 12,000 frames have been produced to date (2015), counting from 1934, of which some 16% are known to have survived. The frames are highly sought by collectors.
