= Flying Pigeon =

Chinese publicly owned bicycle company

Flying Pigeon Bicycle Co., LTD.
- Type: State-owned bicycle company
- Industry: Bicycles
- Founded: 1936; 90 years ago
- Headquarters: Tianjin, China
- Website: flyingpigeon-bicycle.com

Flying Pigeon (simplified Chinese: 飞鸽; traditional Chinese: 飛鴿; pinyin: fēigē) is a Chinese publicly owned bicycle company based in Tianjin.

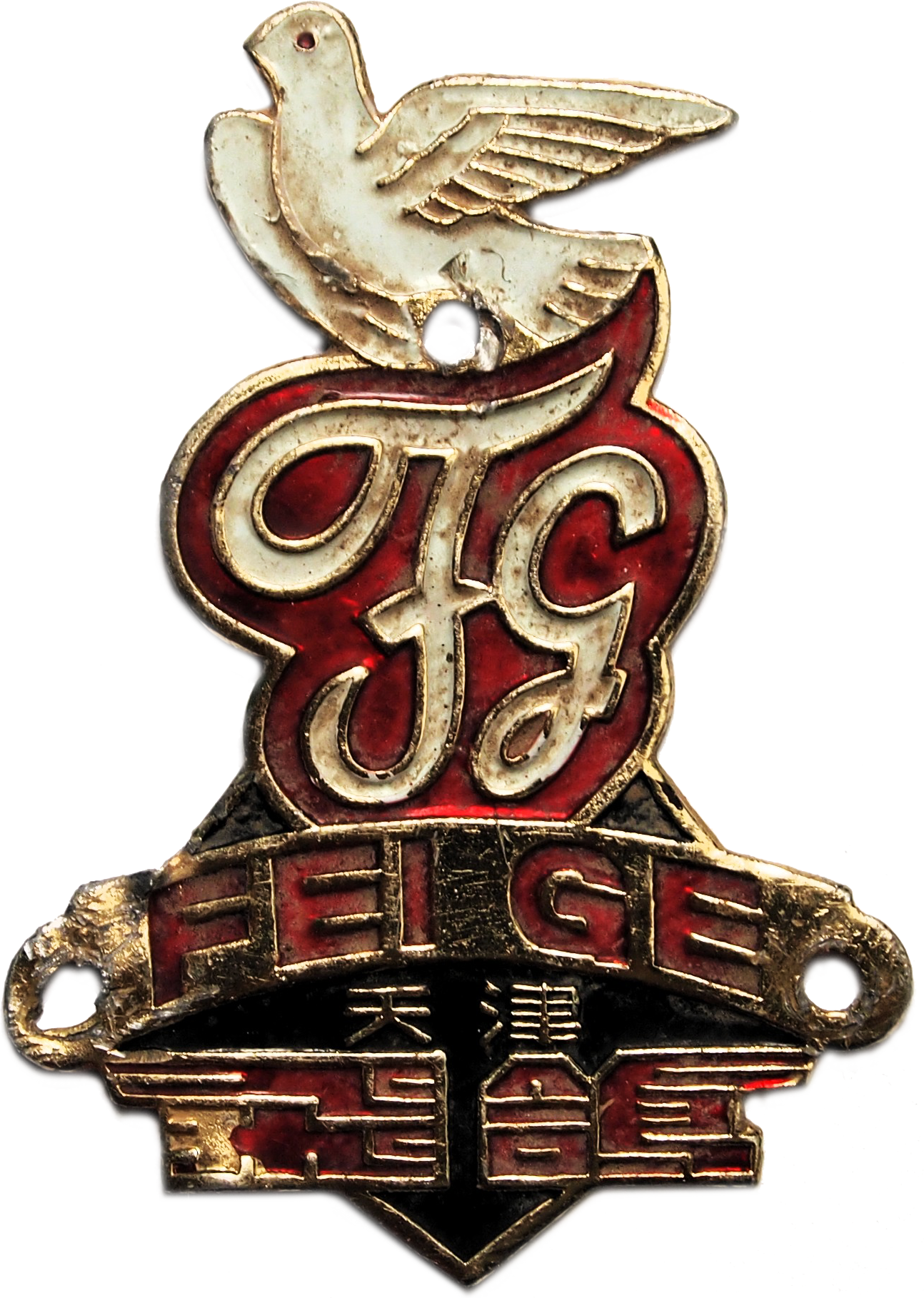
Flying Pigeon's stylized bird head badge.

Since 1950, more than 500 million Flying Pigeon PA-02 bicycles have been made, and as of 2007, more than any other model of vehicle.

== History ==
In 1936, a Japanese businessman built the Changho Works factory in Tianjin, and started to make "Anchor" bicycles. The brand name was changed to "Victory", and then renamed to "Zhongzi". After the Communists led by Chinese Communist Party chairman Mao Zedong came to power in 1949, the bicycle industry was revived.

In April 1949, Communist Party secretary Liu Shaoqi paid a visit to the factory and commanded that it become the first bicycle manufacturer in New China. Their workers were tasked to build a generation of strong, durable, light, and beautiful bicycles for the New China. On July 5, 1950, the first Flying Pigeon bicycle was produced. It was the brainchild of a worker named Huo Baoji, who based his classic model on the 1932 English Raleigh roadster. The "Flying Pigeon" name was intended as an expression of peace during the war in Korea. The Flying Pigeon logo is a stylized dove, representing concord and harmony, resting on the initials FG. Previous logos have depicted the dove in flight.

The Flying Pigeon was at the forefront of the bicycle phenomenon in the People's Republic of China. The vehicle was the government approved form of transport, and the nation became known as zixingche wang guo, the Kingdom of Bicycles. A bicycle was regarded as one of the Four Big Things of every citizen, alongside a sewing machine, watch, and radio –important items which signified a (permanent) increase in living standards.The Flying Pigeon bicycle became a symbol of an egalitarian social system that promised little comfort but a reliable ride through life.

Throughout the 1960s and 1970s, the logo became synonymous with almost all bicycles in the country. The Flying Pigeon became the single most popular vehicle on the planet, becoming so ubiquitous that Deng Xiaoping—the post-Mao paramount leader who launched China's reform and opening up in the 1970s— defined prosperity as "a Flying Pigeon in every household".

In the early 1980s, Flying Pigeon was the country's biggest bike manufacturer, selling 3 million cycles in 1986. Its 20-kilogram black single-speed models were popular with workers, and there was a waiting list of several years to get one, and even then buyers needed good guanxi (connections) in addition to the purchase cost, which was about four months' wages for most workers.

== Traditional models ==
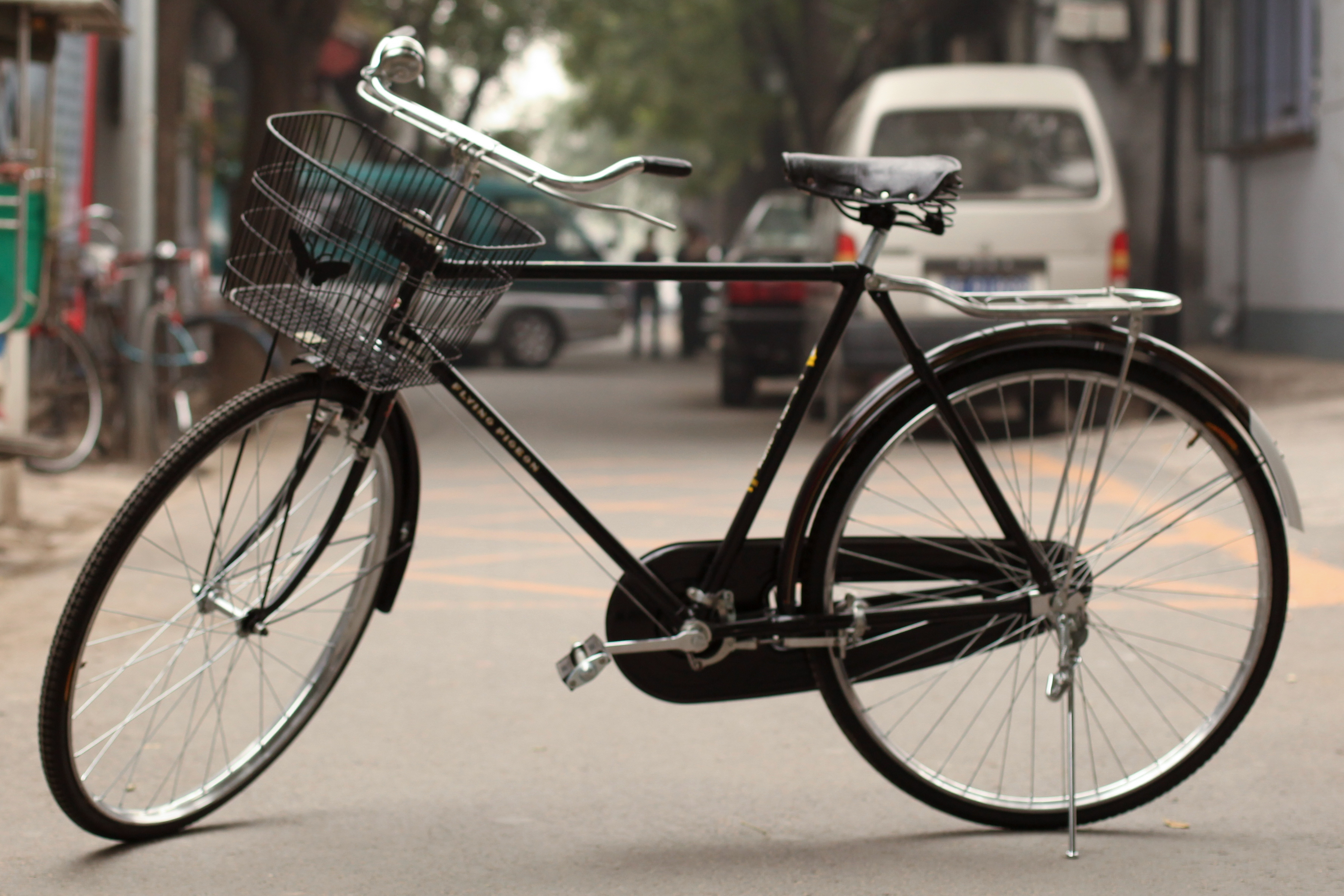
A Flying Pigeon in a hutong.

The classic Flying Pigeon bicycles are the PA-02 and PA-06 (men's) and PB-13 (women's): single speed black roadsters.

They are simple, relative to other bicycles. They are all-steel single speed with 28 in (710 mm) wheels, fenders, fully covered chain, sprung leather saddle, rear rack and rod brakes (a handlebar lever connects directly to the brake pads via a solid rod), double stand (PA02 and PA06) or side stand (PB13). They are only available in one colour, black, except for the flare of vanilla at the fender tips. They can be equipped with a dynamo lighting set.

These specifications are standard to all three models, except where otherwise noted.

- twenty-eight-inch (71.1 cm) by 1 1/2-inch (38 mm) (ISO 635) wheels, 32 spokes in front, 40 spokes in the rear, Westwood rims.
- Rear hub 120 mm (4.7 in) OLD, front hub 100 mm (3.9 in) OLD
- Chain wheel 42 teeth, sprocket 20 teeth
- 22-inch (55.9 cm) frame size (PA-06 also available in 24-inch (61 cm))
- Single-speed gearing of 58.8 gear inches

=== PA-02 ===
The classic Flying Pigeon bicycle is the PA-02, a single-speed with 28-inch wheels, mudguards (fenders), a fully enclosed chain case, a rear rack and rod-actuated brakes. The typically available color is black. However, other colors are available, such as: dark green, which is used by China Post; red, which is used by Chinese municipal fire departments; and yellow, orange and blue, which are used by various businesses. Most models are pinstriped.

For most of the Communist era, the price of a Flying Pigeon was 150 yuan, about two months' salary, with a waiting list that stretched into years. An apocryphal story tells that a farmer once offered to trade his entire crop to speed up delivery of his Pigeon.

The Tianjin factory produces about 800,000 bikes yearly.

=== PA-06 ===
The PA-06 model is distinguished by the use of a double top-tube. It is also the only model also manufactured in the larger 24-inch (610 mm) frame size (The PA-02 and PB-13 are only available in 22 inch frame size). This feature is often cited as being designed to carry pigs, but there is little factual basis for this claim. Double top-tubes are often used to stiffen larger frames in order to reduce "frame-whip" (lateral torsion).

=== PB-13 ===
The PB-13 is the ladies' version of the classic Flying Pigeon, using a step-through style frame, similar to a Dutch Omafiets.

== Company ==
In 1998, the Flying Pigeon factory in central Tianjin was shut down and operations were relocated to an industrial zone on the city's periphery. It employs 600 workers who produce the bikes, using modern automated equipment. Flying Pigeon now makes 40 models of bicycles, most of which look like modern mountain or city bikes, in various colors. The frames are welded piecemeal; wheels are built on an assembly line, with spokes first laced to hubs, then threaded to rims. Workers hand-spray rough welds with coatings of enamel, and the bikes move on conveyors similar to those of a dry cleaners.

Despite declining domestic sales, the Flying Pigeon remains China's most popular bicycle, if only because much of the brand's old rolling stock is still in service. The government estimates that a half-billion bikes are in use throughout China, many handed down through generations. The Pigeon is a nostalgically regarded artifact of China's post-revolutionary era. In 1994, the government named the bicycle a "national key trademark brand under protection", enshrining it similarly to national treasures.

The company does not advertise its traditional bicycles such as the PA-02 as the brand is so infused in Chinese society and culture. There are, however, localized advertising campaigns.
