= Alex Moulton =

English engineer (1920–2012)

Alex Moulton CBE FREng
- Born: Alexander Eric Moulton; 9 April 1920; Stratford-upon-Avon
- Died: 9 December 2012 (aged 92); Bath, Somerset
- Education: Marlborough College; University of Cambridge (BA)
- Engineering career
- Employers: Bristol Aeroplane Company; Moulton Bicycle
- Projects: Moulton Bicycle; Hydrolastic
- Awards: Queen's Award for Technical Innovation (1967)

Alexander Eric Moulton (9 April 1920 – 9 December 2012) was an English engineer and inventor, specialising in suspension design.

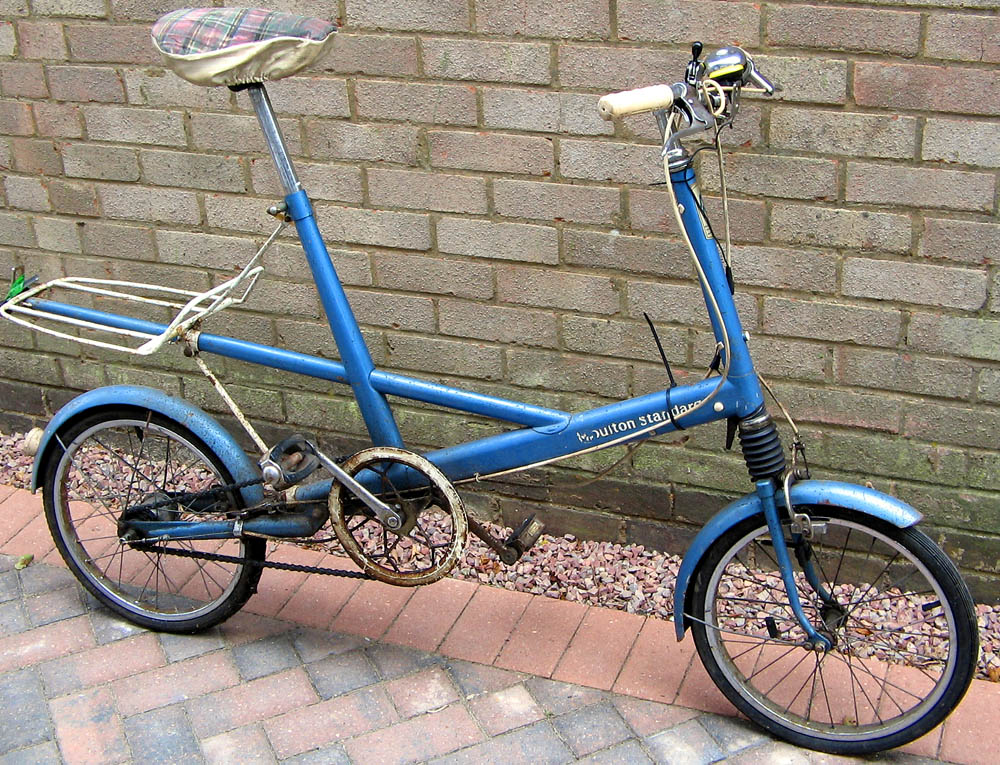
A 1965/66 Moulton "New Look" Standard M1 bicycle

== Early life and education ==
Moulton's father, John Coney Moulton, was a naturalist working in the Far East. Alex Moulton was the great-grandson of the rubber pioneer Stephen Moulton, the founder of the family business called George Spencer, Moulton & Co. Ltd, based at Bradford-on-Avon, Wiltshire.

Moulton was educated at Marlborough College and the University of Cambridge where he was an undergraduate at King's College.

== Career ==
During World War II he worked on engine design at the Bristol Aeroplane Company. After the war he joined the family company, which made rubber components such as suspension parts for railway carriages; he turned it towards rubber suspension systems for road vehicles.

In the mid 1950s, Moulton developed an experimental rubber suspension which was tested on a Morris Minor. His friend Alec Issigonis heard of this work and together they designed a fluid and rubber suspension for a new Alvis car, which did not reach production. Moulton also designed "Flexitor" rubber springs for the 1958 Austin Gipsy, an off-road vehicle.

After the family business was acquired by the Avon Rubber Company in 1956, Moulton established Moulton Developments Limited to design the suspension system for British Motor Corporation's new small car, the Mini, that was being designed by Issigonis. The combination of conical rubber springs and small wheels was one of the many innovative developments that allowed Issigonis to achieve the Mini's small overall size. This was later refined into the hydrolastic and hydragas suspension systems used on later British Leyland cars such as the Austin Maxi, Austin Allegro, Princess and Rover Metro, and later on Rover Group's MG F sports car.

Moulton also designed the Moulton bicycle, launched in 1962, again using rubber suspension and small wheels. A factory was built at Bradford-on-Avon, and Moulton Bicycles Ltd soon became the second-largest frame builder in the country.

=== Awards and honours ===
Moulton was appointed Commander of the British Empire (CBE) in the 1976 New Year Honours for services to industry. Other honours include:

- The Diploma di Medaglia d'Oro, Milan in 1964
- Queen's Award for Technical Innovation 1967
- Awarded Honorary degrees from the Royal College of Art (1967), University of Bath (1971), Cranfield University (1994) and Loughborough University (2006)
- Elected to the faculty of Royal Designers for Industry (1968), serving as master of the faculty from 1981 to 1983
- Elected a Fellow of the Royal Academy of Engineering (FREng) in 1980
- Served as Vice-President of the Royal Academy of Engineering from 1985 to 1988
- He has an entry in the Golden Book of Cycling, which he signed when he was 71
- In 1997 he was awarded the Misha Black award and was added to the College of Medallists

== Personal life ==
Moulton lived at The Hall, Bradford-on-Avon a 17th-century mansion. He was a member of Brooks's gentlemen's club in London.

Moulton died on 9 December 2012 at the Royal United Hospital in Bath. His funeral, which was attended by 'Moultoneers' from all over the world, took place at Holy Trinity Church, Bradford-on-Avon on 19 December, after which he was interred in the family grave at Christ Church in the same town beside his great-grandfather, Stephen Moulton, who founded the Moulton dynasty in the Wiltshire town in 1848.

Moulton never married, and had no immediate survivors.

== Legacy ==
Under Moulton's will, the Grade I listed Hall – along with investments, land, outbuildings and cottages – was gifted to a charitable trust. In 2020 the trust was reorganised as a charitable incorporated organisation, the Alex Moulton Charitable Trust, which continues to preserve and maintain the Hall and its collections, and promote engineering and design.

The Moulton Bicycle name has undergone several changes of ownership. Since 2008 the name has been used by a privately held company which has a small modern factory just east of the Hall.
