= Lugged steel frame construction =

Bicycle construction method

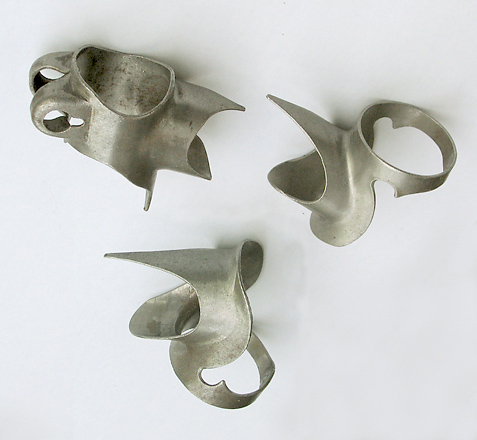
Prugnat type 62 D lugs. Clockwise from top left: seat lug, upper head lug, lower head lug.

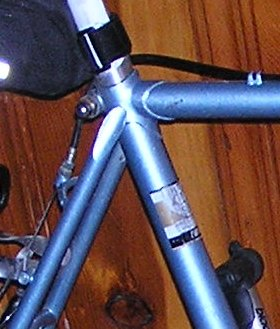
This seat lug joins the seat tube, top tube, and seat stays of a steel touring bicycle frame. It also has an opening in which to insert the seat post, and a clamp to hold the seat post securely in place.

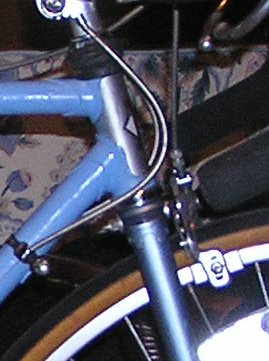
Simple, pointed head lugs on this bike boom road bicycle

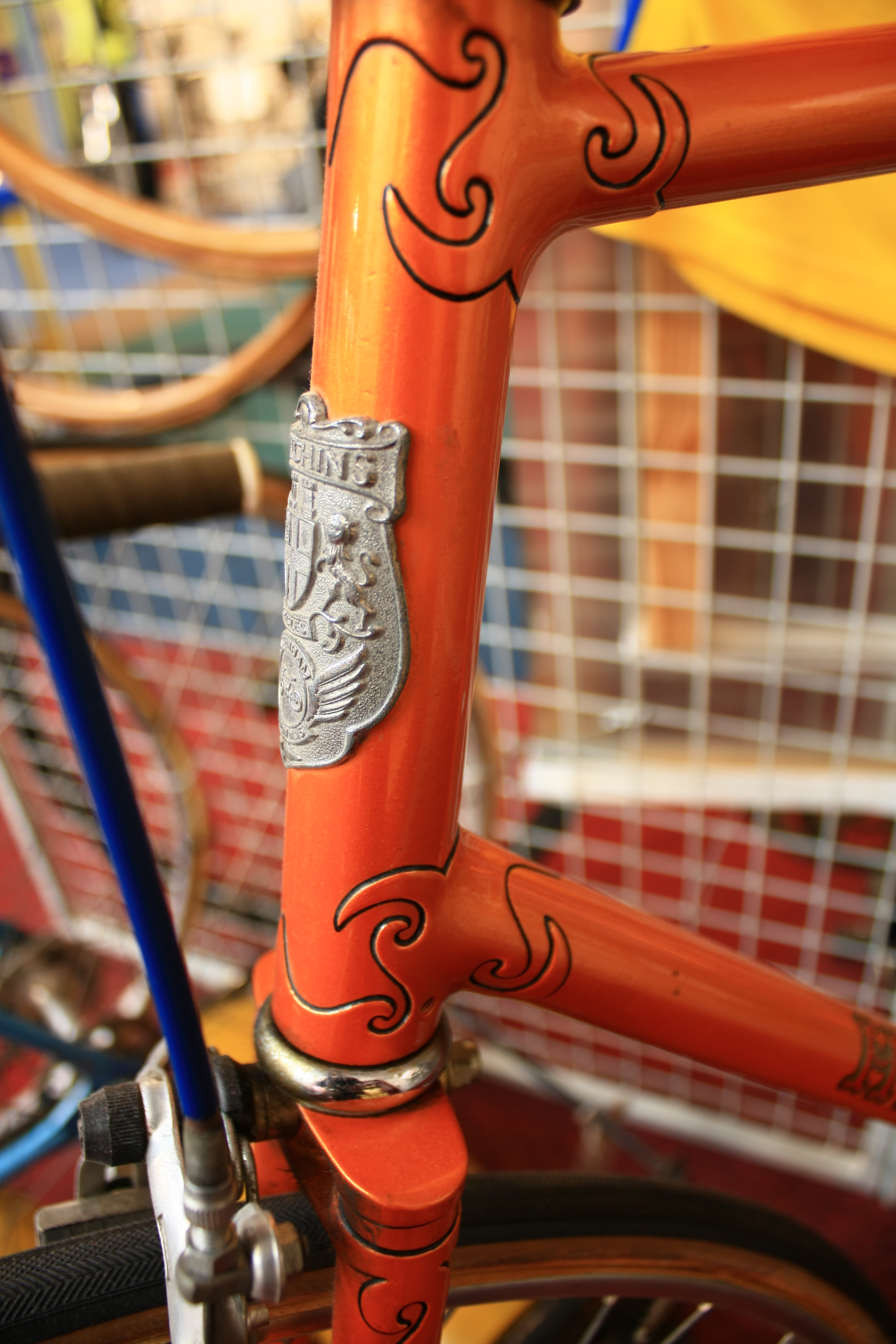
Elaborate hand-cut and filed head lugs which have been outlined in a contrasting colour (luglining) on a Hetchins frame

Lugged steel frame construction is a method of building bicycle frames using steel tubing mated with socket-like sleeves, called lugs. For most of the bicycle's history, steel has been the primary material for bicycle frames, with lugged construction the primary assembling method. Steel continues in use by builders of high-quality steel frames, though its dominance as a frame material has waned as, since the mid-1990s, it has been displaced largely by aluminum and carbon fiber; lugging has been displaced by TIG welding.

== Method of construction ==
Lugged steel construction uses standard cylindrical steel tubes which are connected with lugs, external fittings made of pieces of steel (sometimes stainless steel) which fit over the ends of the tubing. Before assembly, the builder cuts the tubes to the desired length and precisely mitres their ends, providing a tight fit. The end of the tubes are inserted into the lugs and subsequently brazed with a silver or brass filler metal. The lug greatly increases the strength of the joint by distributing the molten filler metal over a larger surface area via capillary action. When brazing a bicycle frame, builders may use a small positioning structure called a jig to hold the tubes in place and maintain their precise alignment and frame geometry. Four lugs which may be used to construct a typical diamond frame include:

- seat lug or seat cluster joins the top tube and seat tube; the ends of the seat stays are usually brazed directly to the sides or back of the seat lug, although some newer designs of seatlugs also have sockets for the seat stays. Also has an opening for the seatpost
- bottom bracket shell joins the chain stays, seat tube, and downtube, and includes a threaded cylindrical socket for the bottom bracket
- upper head lug joins the head tube and top tube
- lower head lug joins the head tube and down tube

The two rear dropouts (which join the seat stays to the chain stays, and hold the axle of the rear wheel) may have integral lugs in some designs. The fork dropout or ends may be joined to the fork blades using a similar method as well. The fork crown, which joins the steering tube to the fork blades, may have either an external or internal socket design.

In most lugged steel frames, the lugs have a simple pointed shape. The lug's curves maximize the strength of the joint, while minimizing the possibility of stress risers, which would otherwise make the frame prone to cracking at the end of the lug.

At increased expense, frames may have lugs which are cut and filed by hand into fancy shapes, both for slight weight savings and as a display of craftsmanship. In addition many frame builders file the lugs to thin them, in order to reduce stress concentrations. These ornate or fancy lugs may be painted to accentuate their appearance.

Lugged steel frame can be repaired more easily than MIG or TIG welded steel frames; a broken tube can be removed by the application of heat to un-braze (known as sweating) its joints, enabling tube replacement.

Steel frames generally are easier to repair than aluminium or exotic materials, and for this reason steel frames are preferred by many bicycle tourists, who often ride long distances in remote areas. Lugs also reinforce the joints, often resulting in a stronger frame, this gives lugged frames in particular an advantage for touring cyclists.

== Types of lug ==
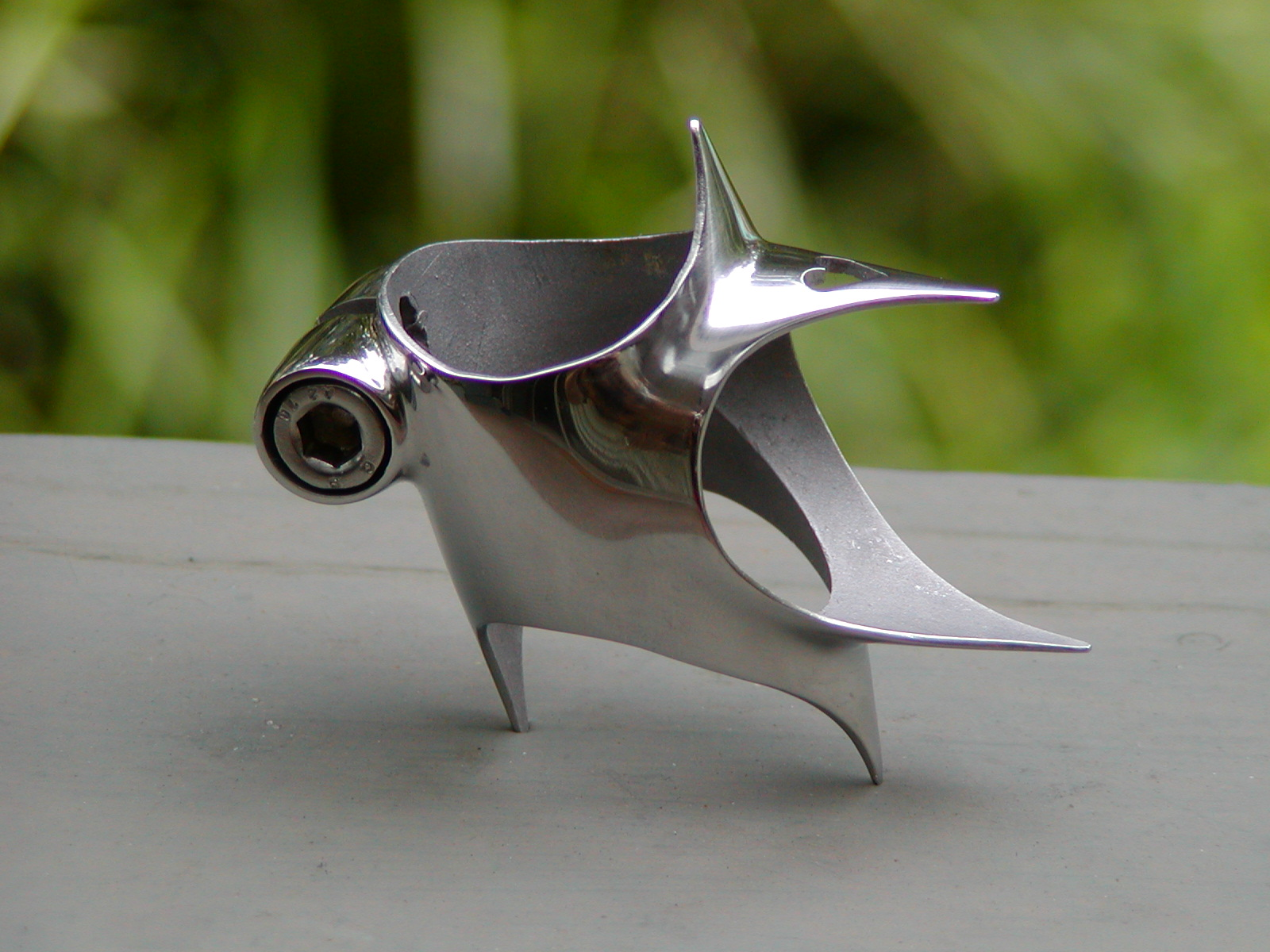
A stainless steel investment cast seat lug, with hand filed cutout, which has been polished to a mirror finish. These lugs necessitate construction with silver rather than brass filler.

Traditional stamped lugs (a.k.a. pressed lugs) are formed by pressing sheet steel over a mandrel, bending them to shape, and then welding the seams. These lugs are of constant thickness resulting in stress risers, if large amounts of file work are not done to alter the thickness of the lug. They are easily identified by the visible seam.

Lugs used today on higher performance bicycles are investment cast (a.k.a. lost wax process). Copies of the lugs are made in wax, and they are attached together into a "tree". The tree is surrounded by ceramic and fired in a kiln, thereby melting the wax and setting the ceramic. Finally, molten steel is poured in to produce the lug. Cast lugs have many advantages over stamped lugs: they allow much finer detail, tighter tolerances (and correspondingly less manipulation and file work), and more accurate angles, and they can be made from superior materials (chromoly or stainless steel). The disadvantages of cast lugs are few: casting doesn't allow for long points or cutouts (done for aesthetic appeal), it is difficult to bend the lug to change the angle (requiring framebuilders to order lug sets that precisely match the desired frame geometry), and they are more expensive.

A relatively recent trend has been toward the use of stainless steel for investment cast lugs, as shown in the picture on the right. These lugs do not require painting, but must be brazed using silver filler rod, which necessitates much better heat control and better fit of lug to tube.

Cast lugs are found on higher quality production bikes, and virtually all custom bikes now made; stamped lugs are found on less expensive production bikes, and older custom bikes. Lugs are usually stamped with a letter or symbol code identifying the maker, and possibly the angle.

== History of lugged steel construction ==
From the late 19th century until the 1970s, this method of frame construction was favored because the lower temperatures of brazing (silver brazing in particular) had less of a negative impact on the tubing strength than high temperature welding, which can seriously weaken many steel alloys. Brazing thus allowed relatively thin walled, lightweight tubes to be used without loss of strength. However, recent advances in metallurgy have created steel tubing that is not adversely affected (or may even be improved) by high temperature welding. This has allowed both TIG and MIG welding to displace lugged steel construction, in large part because these methods lend themselves more easily to automation and reduce the cost by eliminating the lugs.

Conversely, lugged steel construction remains popular among builders of custom-fit bicycle frames, and among amateur framebuilders, since it is one of the simplest methods of constructing a bicycle frame by hand in a small workshop.

== Lugged steel frames today ==
=== North America ===
Despite the fact that lugged steel frames are no longer mass-produced, frames are still available. There is a trade of used bicycles in North America, especially in large cities and college towns. Because of their durable construction, many lugged steel frames from the 1980s, 1970s, and earlier remain in usable condition.

Japanese- and French-made frames from the bike boom are particularly common in North America. These range widely in quality: low-end frames are made of ordinary high-tensile steel using thick, heavy tubing and stamped steel dropouts. Better frames are nearly always made of some variant of chromoly steel alloy and include forged or investment-cast dropouts. Higher-end frames are often made of butted steel tubing, which is thicker at the ends and thinner in the middle, reducing weight but increasing the cost. New lugged frames are manufactured, often to custom geometry from a number of speciality manufacturers.

=== China and India ===
The utility bicycles manufactured in large quantities in China and India, (such as the Flying Pigeon) and exported to countries in the region, are made from lugged steel.
