= Westwood rim =

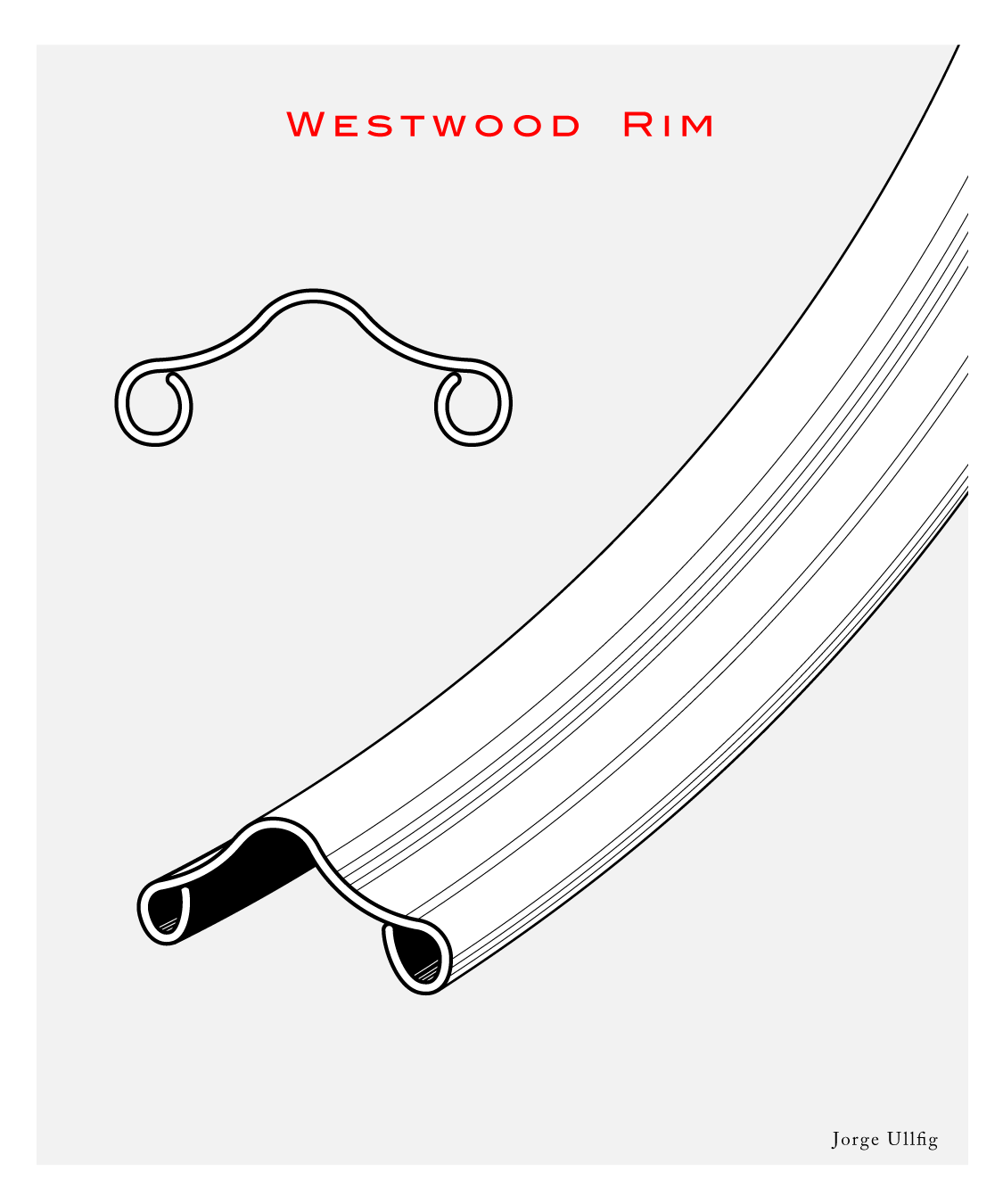
Westwood-profile rim

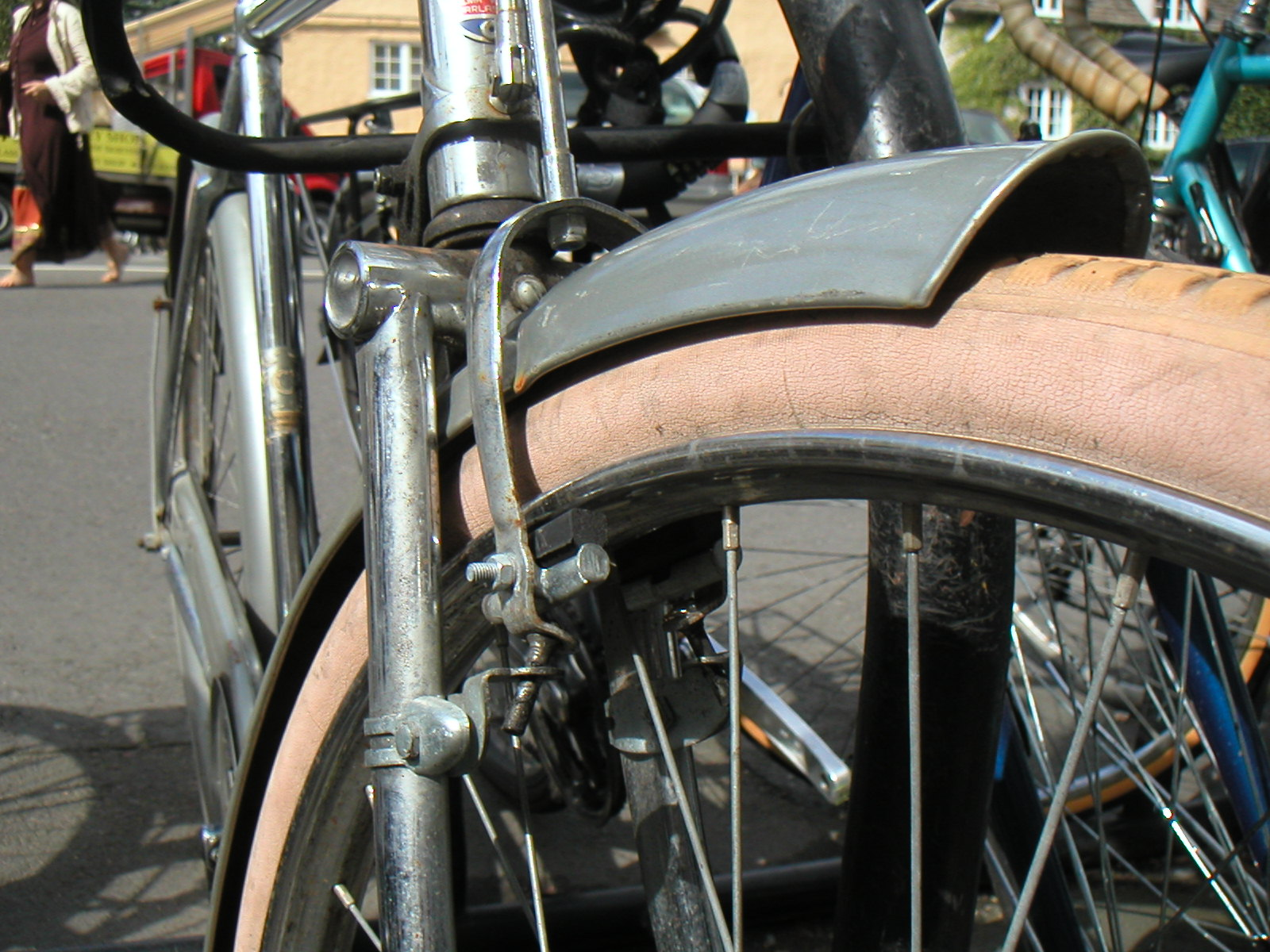
Westwood rim with rod brake

The Westwood rim is a type of rim used on bicycles, an early steel design developed during or before 1891 by Frederick Westwood of Birmingham. Bowden brakes and cables designed for use with this rim were introduced in 1896. Westwood rims have also been found ideal for use with drum brakes. They were last used on the roadster cycles found in Britain up to the 1980s and still common in South and East Asia and Africa and becoming common once again in Europe. Westwood rims have rounded sides, so they are not suitable for use with caliper brakes. Westwood rims features a wide single-wall cross section, the inside circumference of the rim has a contoured section shape to aid with strength. Today Westwood-profile rims found in the West are mostly used in drum brake system roadsters and, to a lesser degree, in bicycles with coaster brake systems.

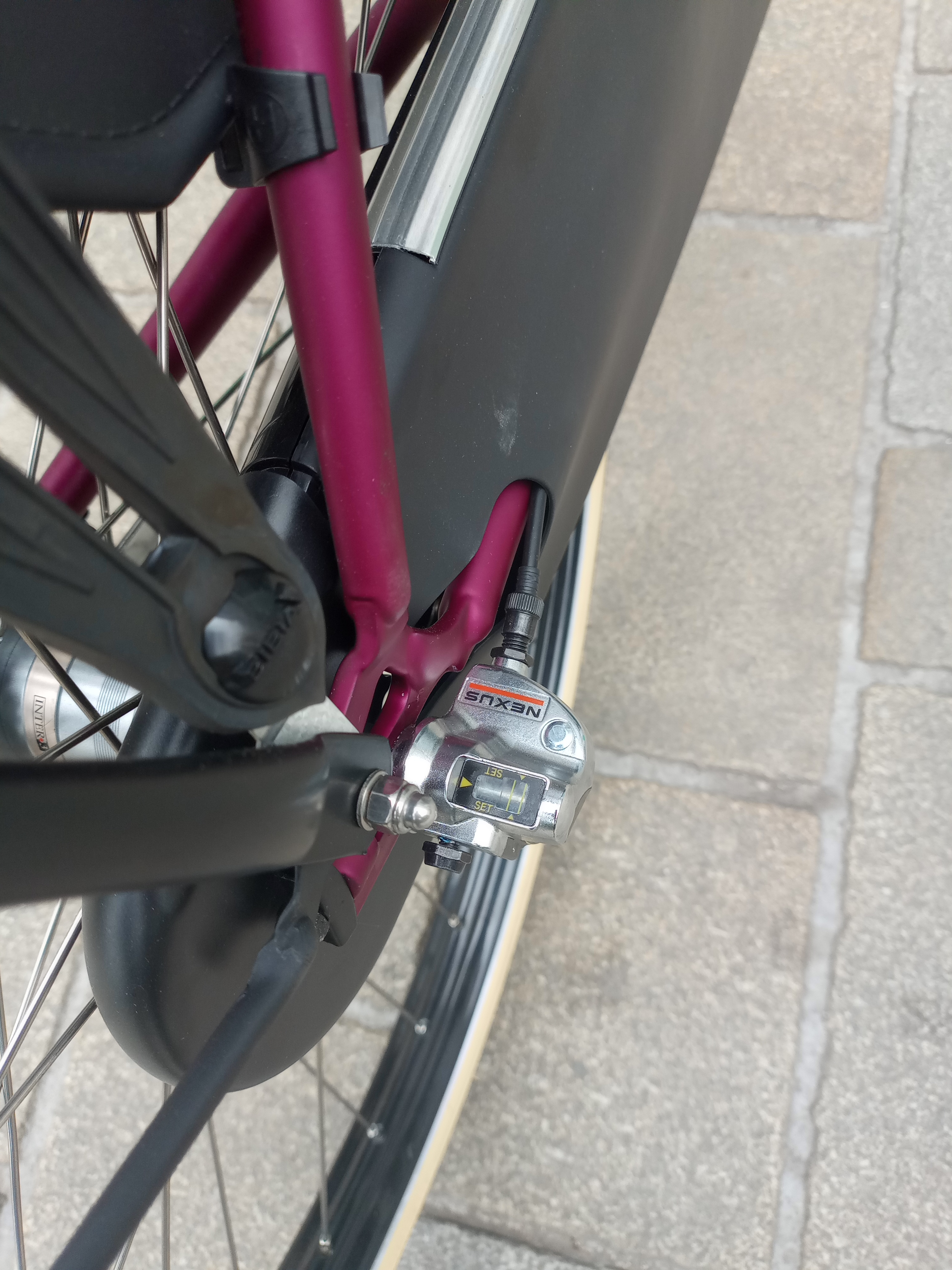
Modern city bicycle with aluminium Westwood-rim wheels

== Variations and sizes ==
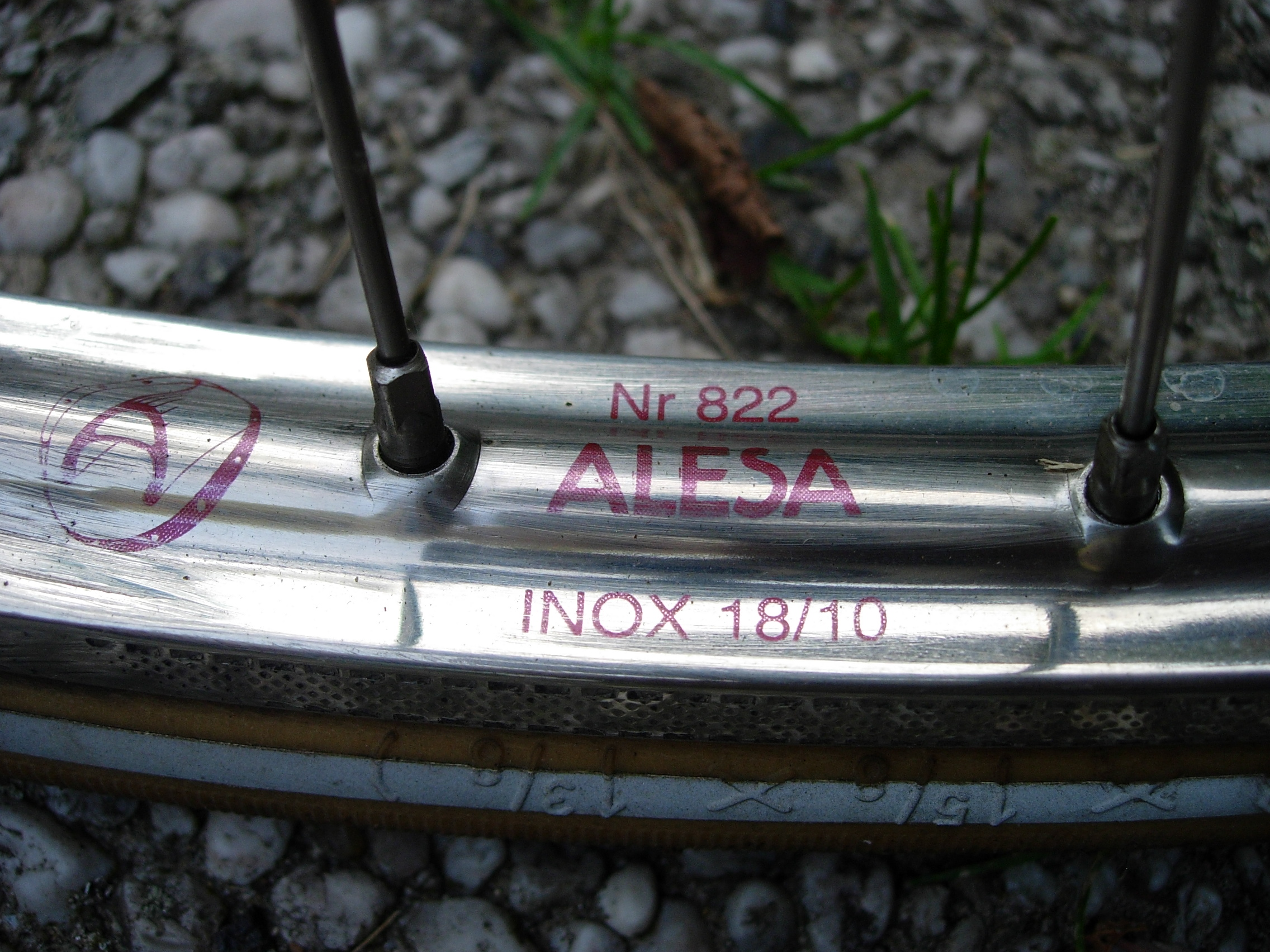
Stainless steel Westrick rim

Raleigh Bicycle Company developed a variation that combined the rod braking surfaces of Westwood rims with flat sides for caliper braking. It has been called "Raleigh Pattern" and "Westrick". They are noted for their strength, and there is also a Schwinn Bicycle Company copy of this design.

Westwood profile rims are most commonly seen in sizes 635 mm (28 in × 1 1/2 in or 711 mm × 38 mm), also marked 700 B,
but they are made in most of the middleweight sizes of:

- 590 mm (650 A) – 26 in × 1 3/8 in (660 mm × 35 mm)
- 584 mm (650 B) – 26 in × 1 1/2 in (660 mm × 38 mm)
- 540 mm (600 A) – 24 in × 1 3/8 in (610 mm × 35 mm)
- 507 mm (24 in × 1.75 in or 610 mm × 44 mm)
- 406 mm (20 in × 1.75 in or 508 mm × 44 mm)

== See also ==
- Bicycle wheel
- Bicycle brake systems
