= Fredrik Ljungström =

Swedish engineer (1875–1964)

- Fredrik Ljungström in Dagens Nyheter.
- Born: 16 June 1875; Stockholm, Sweden
- Died: 18 February 1964 (aged 88); Lidingö, Sweden
- Education: Östra Real
- Alma mater: Royal Institute of Technology
- Occupations: Engineer; Technical designer Industrialist
- Known for: Ljungström method Ljungström air preheater Ljungström rig Ljungström sailboat Ljungström turbine
- Spouses: Signe (née Söderberg), Elizabeth (née Waesterberg)
- Children: 7, including Olof Ljungström, Gunnar Ljungström
- Parents: Jonas Patrik Ljungström (father); Amalia Bernhardina (née Falck) (mother)
- Relatives: Birger Ljungström (brother); Georg Ljungström (brother); Oscar Ljungström (brother); George Spaak (brother-in-law); Johan Börjesson (great-uncle); Johan Wingård (great-uncle); Arthur Lundblom (son-in-law); Torsten Cassel (son-in-law)
- Family: Ljungström

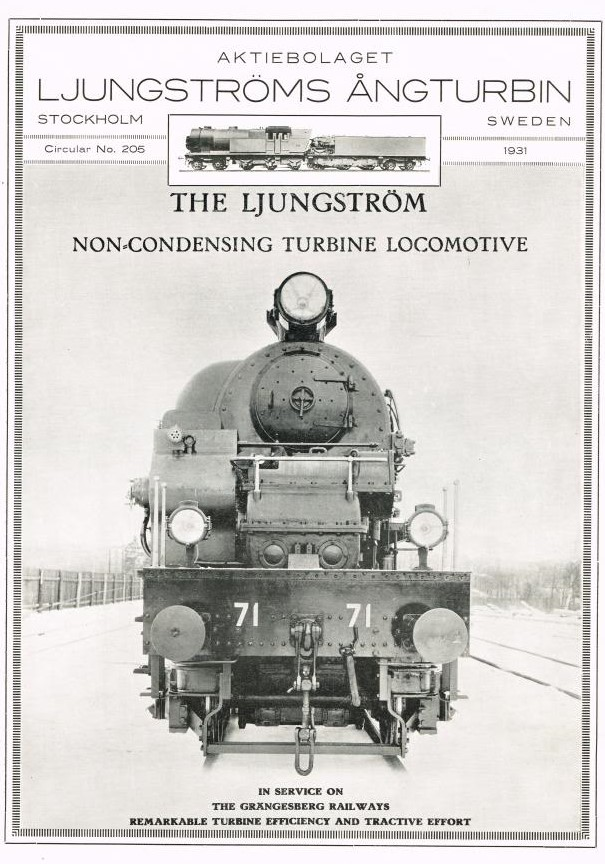
The Ljungström Non-condensing Turbine Locomotive by Ljungström Steam Turbine Co. (Swedish: Aktiebolaget Ljungströms Ångturbin) (1931), established in 1908.

Fredrik Ljungström (16 June 1875 – 18 February 1964) was a Swedish engineer, technical designer, and industrialist.

Considered one of the foremost inventors of Sweden, Fredrik Ljungström accounted for hundreds of technical patents alone and in collaboration with his brother Birger Ljungström (1872–1948): from early bicycling free wheeling hubs techniques and mechanical automatic transmissions for vehicles, to steam turbines, air preheaters, and circular arc hulls for sailing boats. He co-founded companies such as The New Cycle Company, Ljungström Steam Turbine Co. and Ljungström Swedish Turbine Manufacturing Co. (STAL), and associated with other industrialists such as Alfred Nobel, Helge Palmcrantz, Gustaf de Laval, Curt Nicolin and Gustaf Dalén. As innovative as his ideas were in function, they also often turned out in terms of unconventional external design, such as his steam turbine locomotives and sailboats.

During the resource scarcity of World War II, Fredrik Ljungström's innovative technology for oil shale underground gasification by electrical energy, called the Ljungström method, provided a strategical impact for the Swedish Armed Forces. In addition, Ljungström's technology contributed to the first Swedish jet engine, torpedoes, and more.

With Fredrik Ljungström's air preheater implemented in a large number of modern power stations around the world until this day with total attributed worldwide fuel savings estimated to 4,960,000,000 tons of oil, "few inventions have been as successful in saving fuel as the Ljungström Air Preheater". In 1995, the Ljungström air preheater was distinguished as the 44th International Historic Mechanical Engineering Landmark by the American Society of Mechanical Engineers. His works are represented by the Swedish National Museum of Science and Technology, the Nordic Museum, and the Swedish Railway Museum, as well as internationally such as by the Science Museum, London, England and by Museo Nazionale Scienza e Tecnologia Leonardo da Vinci in Milan, Italy.

== Early life and background ==
Fredrik Ljungström was born in 1875 in Stockholm to cartographer Jonas Patrik Ljungström and Amalia (née Falck). His second great uncle was Johan Börjesson, and his third great uncle Bishop Johan Wingård. Among his siblings were Georg Ljungström, Oscar Ljungström, Birger Ljungström, and among his brothers-in-law, George Spaak. Fredrik Ljungström was married twice, first to Elizabeth (née Waesterberg), daughter of Amanda Sandborg Waesterberg, from whom he was widowed, and secondly to Signe (née Söderberg), daughter of Wilhelm Theodor Söderberg. Among his issue was Gunnar Ljungström, and among his sons-in-law, Arthur Lundblom and Torsten Cassel.

Educated at Östra Real, he attended the Royal Institute of Technology from where he was subsequently conferred an Honorary Doctorate in 1944. Technical innovativity was notably initiated in the ateliers of his father in Östermalm in Stockholm, that cooperated among others with the early manufactory of L. M. Ericsson. Of importance to his significant autodidact studies was also the tutorship in physics by Salomon August Andrée, as was the early mentorship of Alfred Nobel. Later, Fredrik Ljungström would in turn offer mentorship to junior industrialists such as Curt Nicolin.

Alfred Nobel was aged 61 when he met Fredrik and Birger Ljungström, who were 19 and 22 years old respectively. Nobel, who didn't have any children of his own, would enthusiastically collaborate in the brothers' early endeavours. Nobel and the brothers soon became good friends, discussing the world's problems and existential questions of the time, as a certain "father-and-son-like relation" emerged. 60 years later, when recalling their talks and time spent together, Fredrik Ljungström commended Nobel's capacity to "discuss the most complex questions with the unexperienced youngsters yet on equal terms", and that "his critical eye to the contemporary issues was extraordinarily bright"; concluding that "the blood runs warm in my old veins when I think of him."

Fredrik Ljungström died in 1964 on Lidingö, and was buried at Norra begravningsplatsen, Stockholm.

== Svea Velocipede ==
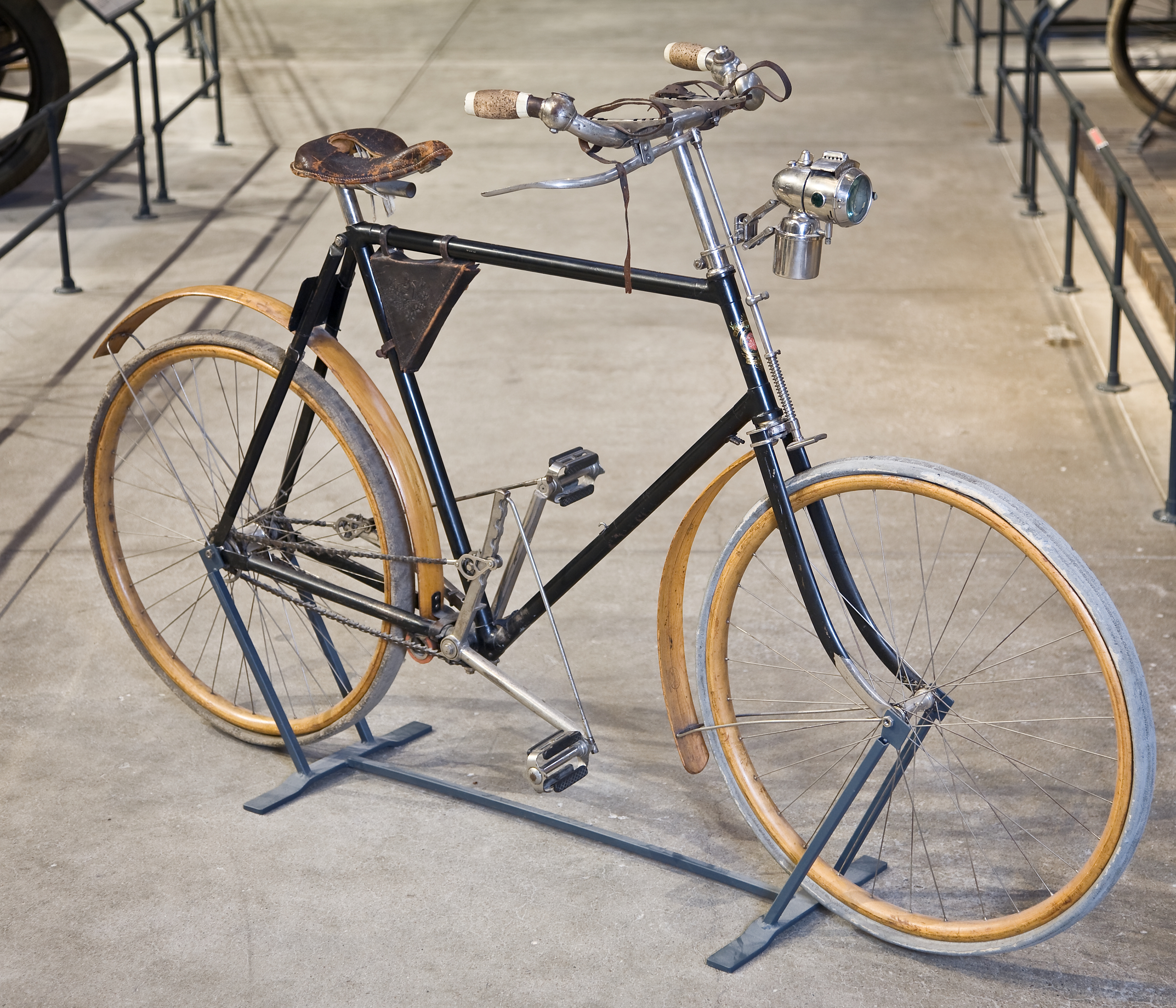
Svea Velocipede exhibited at the Swedish National Museum of Science and Technology.

The Svea Velocipede was an early invention by Fredrik Ljungström in collaboration with his brothers Birger, Axel and Oscar Ljungström. Helge Palmcrantz was also part of the project. An early example in the history of the bicycle, the pedals mechanism of the Svea Velocipede was straight vertical, driven by free wheeling hubs, which was patented by the brothers in 1892, with the shift patented in 1895.

Attended and supported by Alfred Nobel, the project was further developed stretching also to London, where the Ljungström brothers relocated in 1895 upon recommendation by Nobel. Under the company name The New Cycle Company, to which also George Spaak was connected, the product sold about 2,000 units in Sweden, and 150 units in Great Britain. Production remained until 1898. Although the general preference for circular pedal mechanisms became clear with time, later bicycle models on the market would adopt its foot-operated bicycle brakes while also employing its free wheeling hubs.

The Svea Velocipede is exhibited inter alia at the Swedish National Museum of Science and Technology and the Nordic Museum in Stockholm, Sweden.

== Steam generator ==
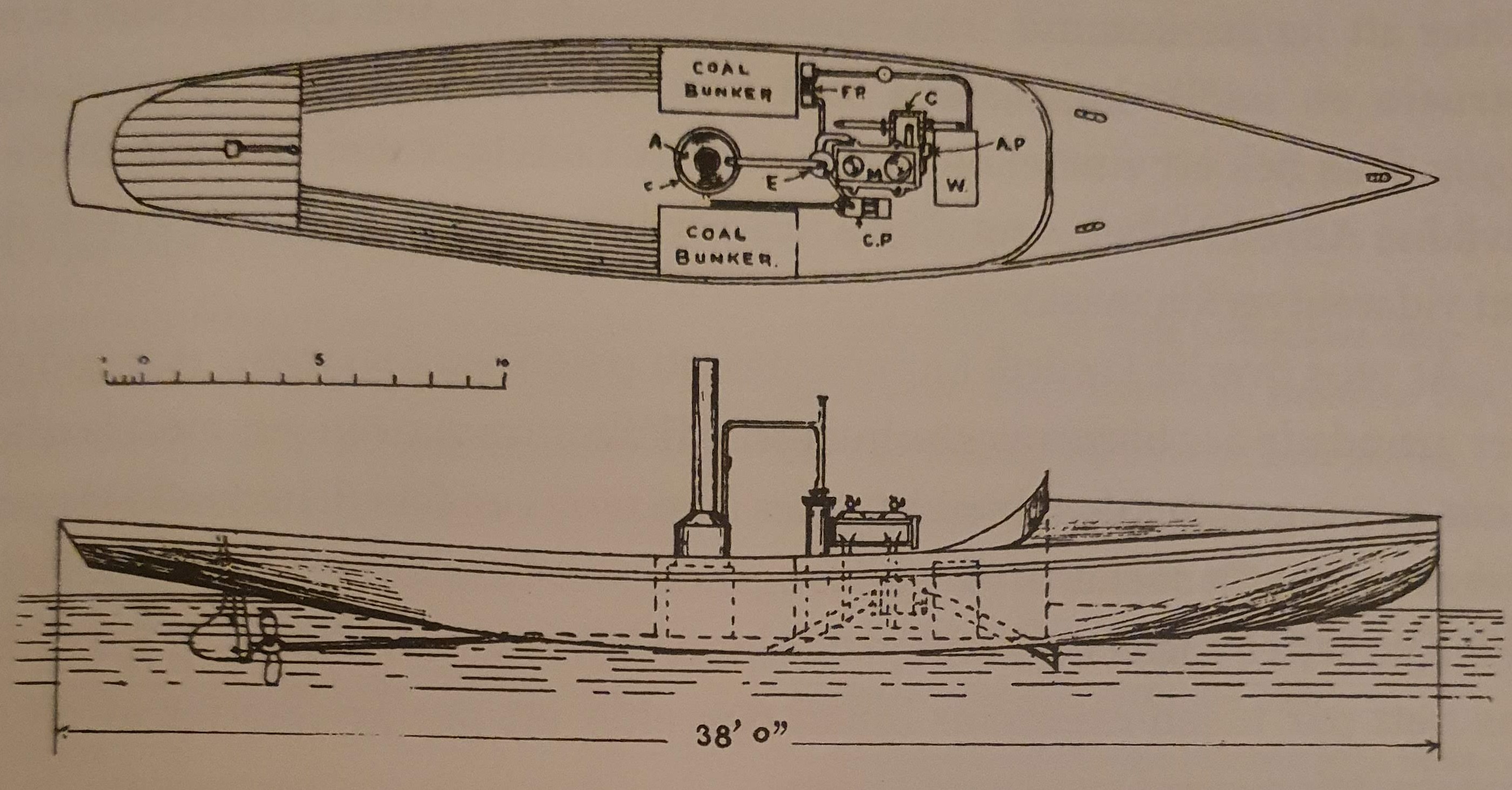
With 12 knot, the Ljungström steam engine sloop (1895) became the fastest steamboat around Stockholm archipelago.

By 1895, Fredrik Ljungström had developed and patented a steam generator, an invention in which Alfred Nobel put particular interest, especially its surface condenser invention. Applied to a sloop, with speed reaching 12 knot, it became the fastest steamboat around Stockholm archipelago.

Also this invention was exported to England in 1896 along with Fredrik, first catching the interest of the early Dunford & Elliot in Newcastle upon Tyne. Although the project's initial supporter Alfred Nobel died in 1896, in 1900 The Ljungström Engine Syndicate Limited was founded for the purposes in Newcastle, to which the brothers relocated along with their families, with George Spaak designated as CEO. Despite production being halted again in 1902, several principles of the construction would prove important to the subsequent Ljungström steam engine.

After The Ljungström Engine Syndicate Limited, Fredrik and Birger went on to work out the first automatic milking device in Sweden, Beta (1901), which caught the interest of Alfred Nobel's nephew Ludvig Nobel (1868–1946) as well as Gustaf Laval at Laval AB Separator. Fredrik would remain leading engineer in this venture, Mjölkningsmaskin AB in Kungsholmen, Stockholm, until 1908. At the same time, the brothers also developed methods for paraffin of mineral oil, i.e. die casting of brass, zinc and aluminium that would become well received. The technology would however only prove successful for the market in 1922.

Soon enough, however, it was evident that steam turbines would be the main focus for the brothers' ventures.

== Steam turbines ==
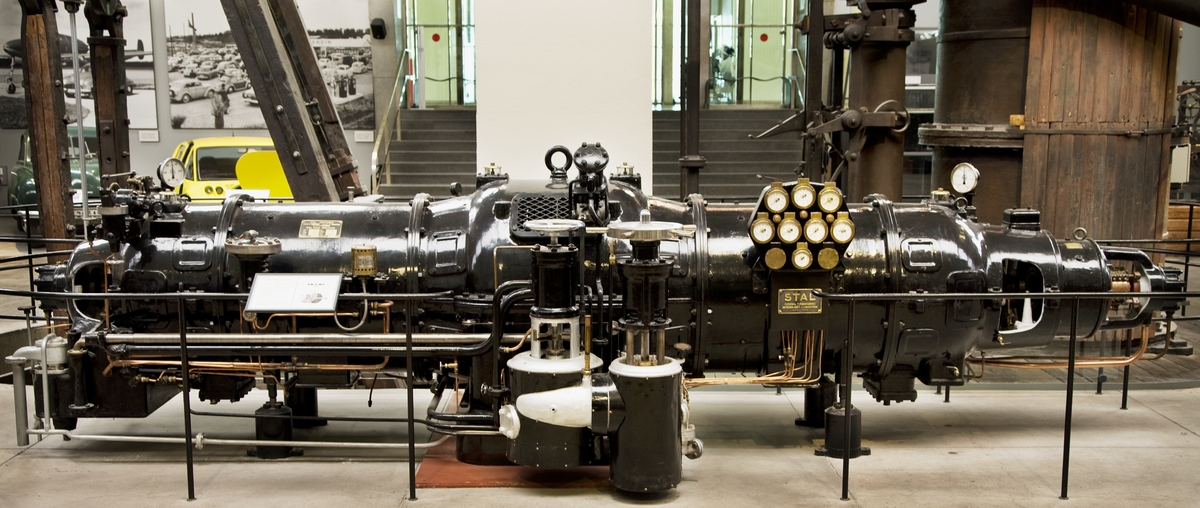
STAL turbine at the entrance of the Swedish National Museum of Science and Technology. A rather small but worthy representative of this turbine type, acquired by the museum in 1993.

It has been said that Fredrik Ljungström's insights in the steam power came to him already as a child at home, observing how cuisine was prepared in the kitchen. While late Alfred Nobel had continuously paid interest in the development of the steam turbines, this invention were also endorsed figures such as Professor Aurel Stodola in 1907.

=== Ljungström Steam Turbine Co. ===
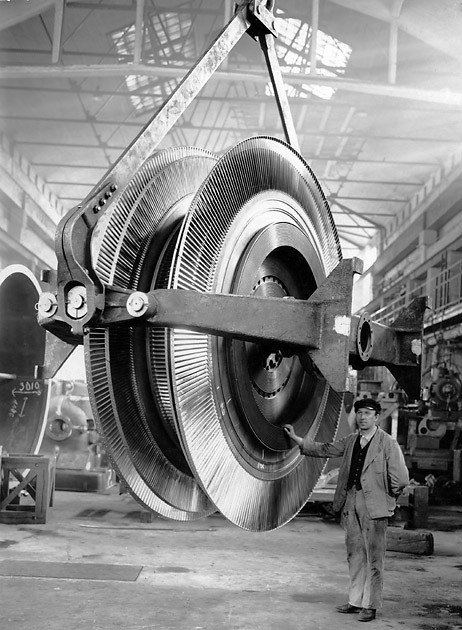
The turbine rotor for Ljungström steam turbine 50 MW electric generator (circa 1932).

The new steam turbine technology became the base for the company Ljungström steam turbine Co. (AB Ljungströms Ångturbin, ALÅ), founded in 1908 in Sweden, that owned all the patents on this revolutionising turbine construction. A workshop was first established on Kungsholmen, in premises where a predecessor of Electrolux had recently been founded. Next year the workshop was relocated to Liljeholmen, Stockholm (future Färgfabriken), where the first turbine was finished in 1910. Already the first unit indicated world records performance. By 1911, a significantly larger unit was produced and successfully tested, with improvements attributed solely to Fredrik Ljungström's hand. With also a new generator construction added by Fredrik, the Ljungström turbine's defining features were now ready for the market. The first turbine was sold to North Metropolitan Electric Power Supply Company for energy supply of the London County Council Tramways. Despite being a prototype, the unit would remain in service for 50 years until it was relocated for exhibition in the Science Museum, London.

=== Ljungström Swedish Turbine Manufacturing Co. ===
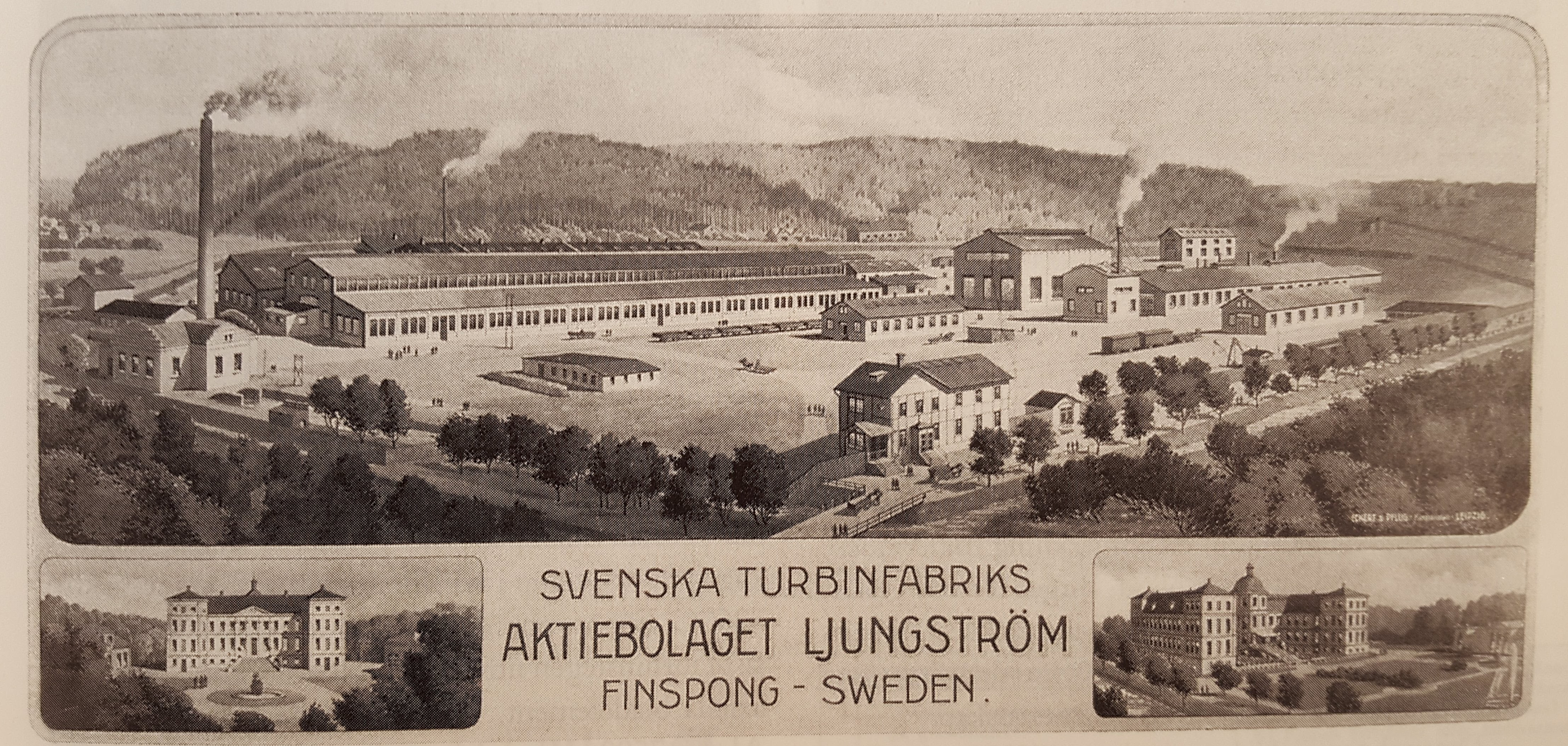
Ljungström Swedish Turbine Manufacturing Co. (Swedish: Svenska Turbinfabriks Aktiebolaget Ljungström, STAL), established in 1913.

In 1913, the brothers cofounded a new company, STAL (Svenska Turbinfabriks Aktiebolaget Ljungström; Swedish turbine manufacturing Co.) under the aegis of ALÅ. Just some two years after the last artillery pieces ceased production in Finspång, Östergötland – a former epicenter of the military industry of Sweden since Louis De Geer founded it in 1631 – STAL acquired Finspång complete with the Finspång Castle along with surroundings territories and real estate, erecting a new large scale factory complex at the site. The design studies and management facilities were installed inside the castle. Mechanical engineer Karl Gustaf Karlson, later Professor at Chalmers University of Technology, was connected to the development. This company handled the manufacturing and sales of complete steam turbine driven electric generators. The turbine provided a 10% higher thermodynamic efficiency than previous constructions, in addition to being more compact, requiring less space. STAL:s solutions proved successful, and with contracts such as with Siemens and General Electric, its activities expanded into Europe and beyond, both for stationary uses as well as for marine vessels.

"Fredrik Ljungström was", writes Anders Johnson in Turbines from Finspång – from STAL to Siemens 1913–2013, "not only a successful inventor but also skilled in management and leading the construction processes." His modern work methods were reflected in a checklist of 56 questions to the engineers at STAL, which also included aspects of safety and ergonomics. Most reputed of these questions was nr 14: "Is the construction unnecessarily hideous?".

STAL was acquired by ASEA in 1916 as they wished to market complete packages with turbine driven electric generators. The deal was carried out when significant owners and representatives where away on business trips in the turbulent Russian Empire, unable to remain in communication. The brothers then left the company but kept control over all the patents and manufacturing licenses for the Ljungström steam turbines within the company ALÅ. STAL merged with De Laval in the 1950s under the name Stal-Laval. In the 1960s, Fredrik Ljungström returned to operations to make significant renewed contributions to the technology the years before he died in 1964. After then having been managed by ABB, the factories would eventually be acquired by Siemens 2003 under the name Siemens Industrial Turbomachinery AB.

The technical solutions developed by the brothers at STAL remains employed all over the world with several world records throughout its history in terms of efficiency, fuel savings, size and power until present-day. In 2009, it was estimated some 328 units where equipped with Ljungström's technology, some of which has consisted of the largest vessels ever produced, from vehicles such as the London Underground or the word's largest supertanker Seawise Giant to a vast number of power plants. Only in Sweden, out of its 18 nuclear plants 16 were equipped with the turbines. Furthermore, increasingly since 2005, the technology has proved successful in solar power. In 2008, almost 100% of all sun power plants where equipped by the Ljungström turbines.

== Steam turbine locomotives ==
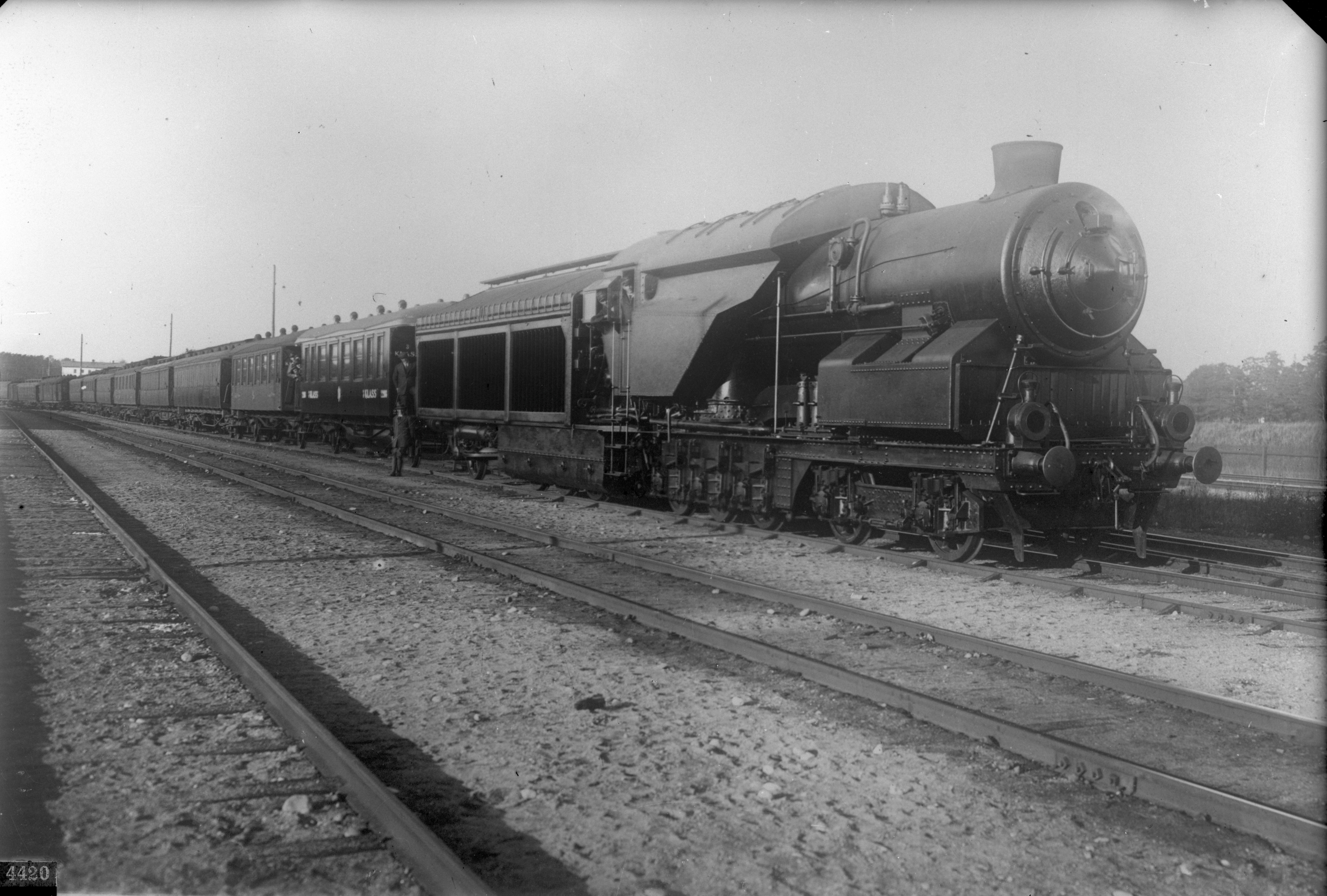
Ljungström steam turbine locomotive (1921), adopted as Swedish Railways Turbine Locomotive Littera Å (1922).

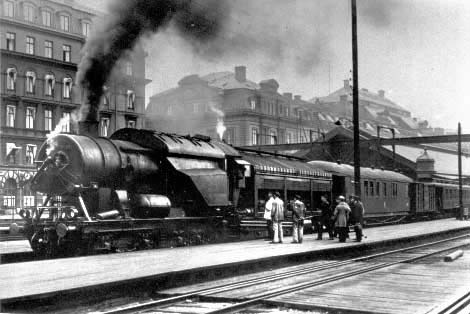
Ljungström steam turbine locomotive at Stockholm Central Station (1922).

The brothers also designed a number of steam turbine locomotives, some of which were highly successful, starting in 1917. One of the largest factories in the region was set up for the purpose in Gåshaga, Lidingö, Stockholm, in 1918, where the Ljungström brothers also worked out the Ljungström heat exchanger for their locomotives. After successfully assembled, this locomotive proved to be the strongest to ever have been produced. On top of the increased power, since the locomotive reused much of the steam from the turbine exits, its permitted more far-reaching distances without having to fill up water.

The first successful attempt for the Swedish Railways in March 1921, patented in July 1922, was a rather odd-looking 12 tons machine. Its three driving axles were located under the tender, and the cab and boiler sat on unpowered wheels. Tests on the designated distance Stockholm-Gothenburg Western Main Line indicated 35% coal savings in comparison with the conventional solutions. The design with driving wheels on both the boiler carriage and the tender with separate turbines would eventually change. The second design was a 2-8-0 similar to a successful freight design. The locomotive was equipped with two wagons for the engine functions. Several patents followed suit the next following years, with Nydqvist & Holm AB selected as licensed manufacturer. Ljungström locomotives where employed for the distances Stockholm-Krylbo and Stockholm-Bollnäs. The turbine effect of this locomotive reached 1,470 kW (1 997 hp) at 10,000 rpm, with a maximum speed of 90 km/h. In 1930, the 2000th locomotive was rolled out of the factory of Nydqvist & Holm AB: TGOJ M3 47, M3t 71, of Ljungström design. This locomotive remained in use until 1931 when it was replaced along the electrification of the Swedish railways in addition to diesel-electric-engined locomotives. Yet, built from 1930 to 1936 by Nydqvist & Holm, Ljungström locomotives continued to replace conventional ones on the Grängesberg-Oxelösund Railway. No condenser was fitted, as its complexity outweighed its thermodynamic advantages. The wheels were driven by a jackshaft. These engines were in use until 1953 when the line was electrified.

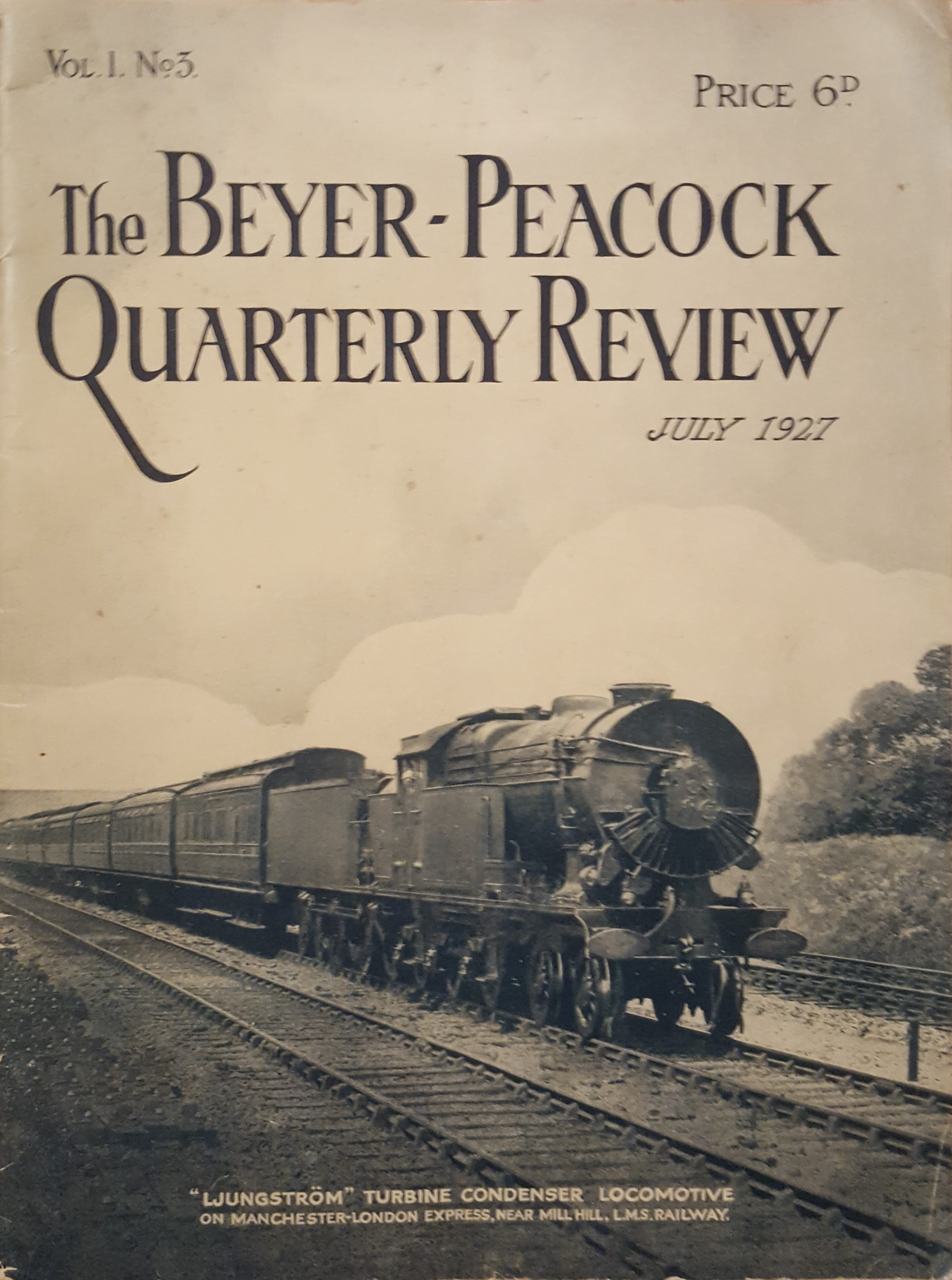
The Beyer-Peacock Quarterly Review (July 1927) by Beyer, Peacock & Company: "'Ljungström' turbine condenser locomotiveLondon, Midland & Scottish Railway."

The "enormous amount of experimental work" made into the Ljungström locomotives also gained international attention. One locomotive was delivered to the Argentine State Railway, designated for the 800 km long distance between Tucumán and Santa Fe, largely through desert with limited water access, needs to which the Ljungström system was especially fitted. This locomotives was equipped with a larger water tank and increased condenser capacity, with turbine power reaching an effect of 1,290 kW (1,753 hp) at 10,000 rpm, decreasing the fuel savings up to 40%. The locomotive remained in service until its disappearance during the Argentine Revolution (1966–1973). From England, Beyer, Peacock & Company sent two engineers to participate and supervise the progress in Stockholm. The company eventually ordered license construction at Gorton Foundry of a copy of the Swedish Railways turbine locomotive SJ Littera Å, employed in London, Midland & Scottish Railway. Its design power was 2,000 hp at 10,500 rpm, corresponding to a speed on the rails of 78 mph. Design steam conditions were 300 lb/sqin at 200 °C superheat. It was employed for regular passenger service in lines from Derby to Manchester, Birmingham and London with "very considerable economies in coal and water consumption." Deutsche Reichsbahn had use for the technology especially in Bavaria.

It is to the Swedish engineer Ljungstrom that the transport world is indebted for the latest and most varied developments of the steam turbine railway locomotive. His experiments have taken place over a number of years. Sweden, being a country deficient in coal, is particularly interested in an increase in the thermal efficiency of the locomotive and in fuel economies.

— Wonders of World Engineering, part 19, 6 July 1937

The old locomotive factory on Lidingö was demolished with dynamite in 1972.

Three engines of the Ljungström type have been preserved in Sweden. Two units (71 and 73) are exhibited by the Railway Museum of Grängesberg, and the third (72) by the Swedish Railway Museum. The one in Grängesberg is the world's only remaining steam turbine locomotive in function, Ljungström M3t nr 71, manufactured in 1930 by Nydqvist & Holm AB and renovated by the Locomotive Museum for the 125th anniversary of the Swedish Railways in June 1981, and again in 2014, financed by the Swedish National Heritage Board. Still "world unique" steam turbine locomotives, with a power of 22 tons, it is still Sweden's most powerful steam locomotive in function: practical tests showed that it was able to transport 2,000 tons in 17 per mille elevation. Digital emulations has also been created for the 3D train simulator video game Trainz.

== Air preheaters ==
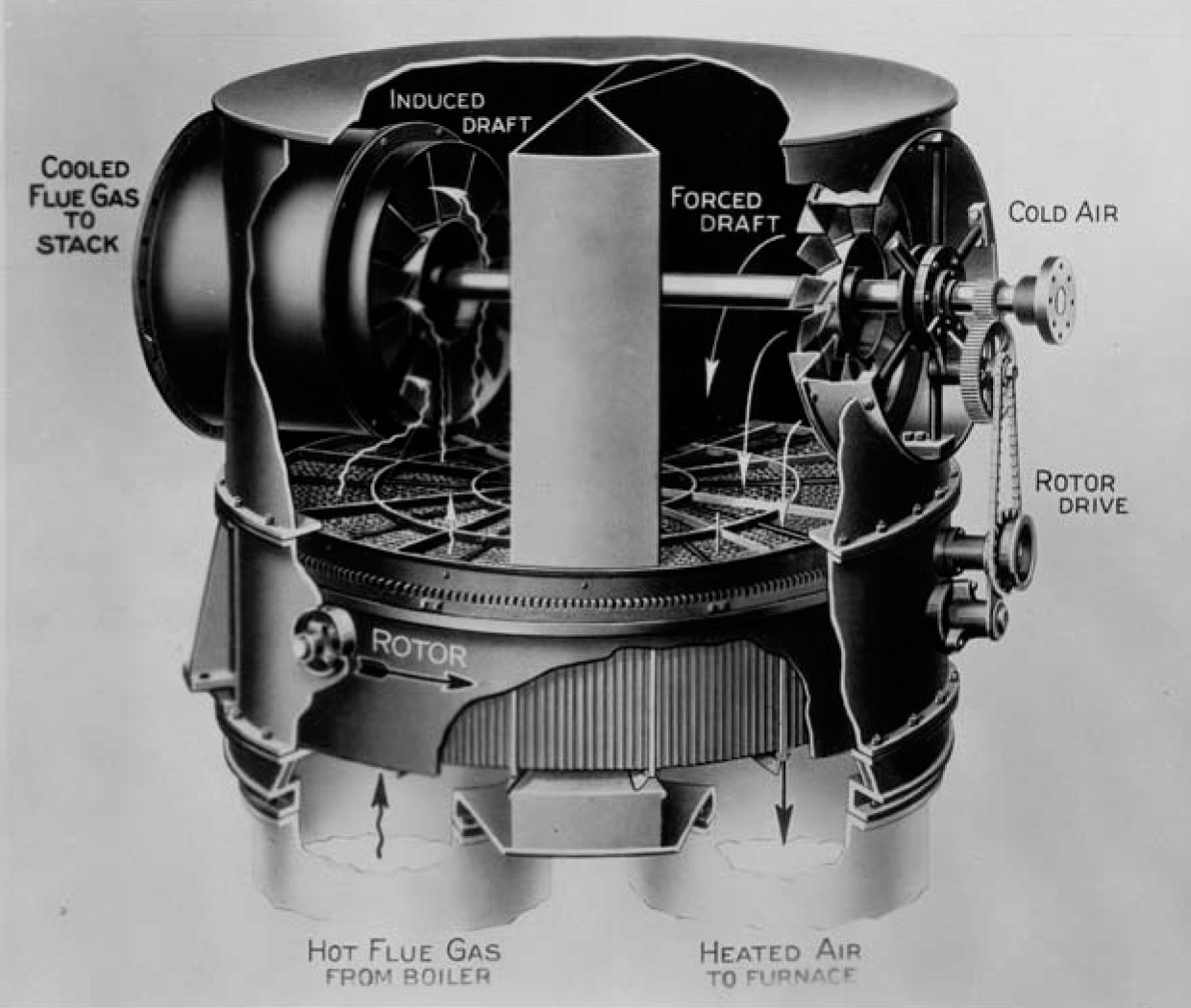
Ljungström regenerative heat exchanger (circa 1930).

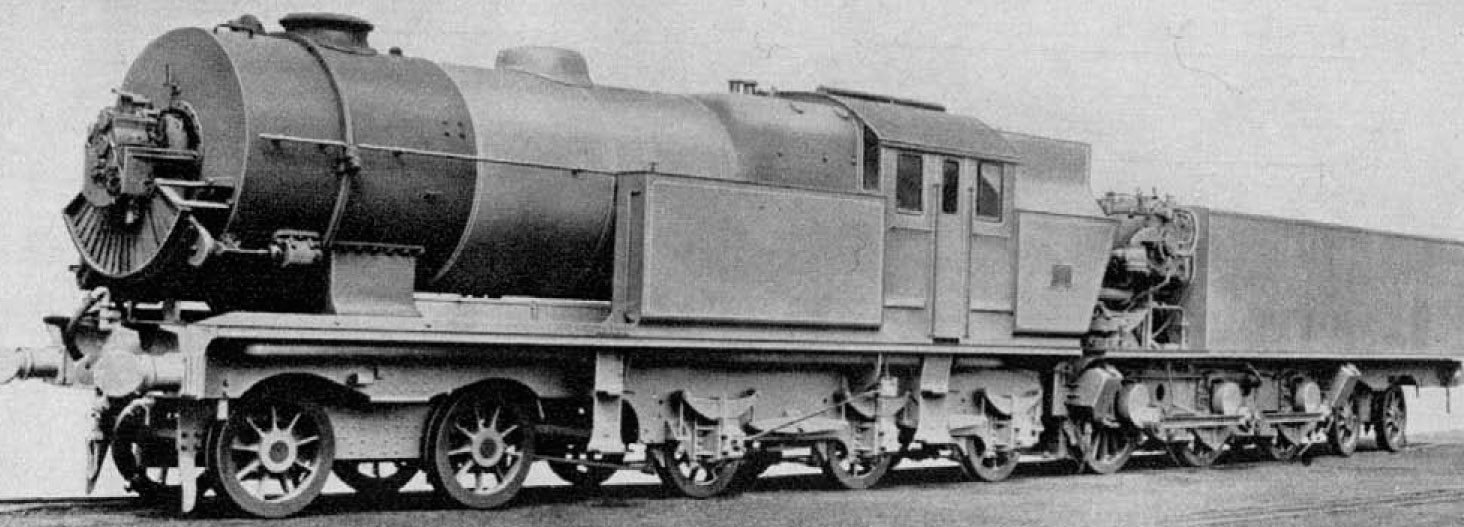
Ljungström steam turbine locomotive with air preheater (circa 1925) (Swedish National Museum of Science and Technology).

Fredrik Lindström also invented an efficient air preheater, which even in a modern utility boiler provides up to 20 percent of the total heat transfer in the boiler process, but only represents 2 percent of the investment. One of Fredrik Ljungströms first patents was a heat exchanger radiator acquired in 1896. Several years later, the Ljungström air preheater innovation was a result of the factory in Lidingö, with patent achieved in 1930, although an anecdote traces the inception to an air conditioning concern during a visit in the smoky premises of the Royal Swedish Opera in Stockholm in 1919.

The factory and workshop activities and laboratories in Lidingö would remain throughout the 1920s, with some 70 personnel. In the 1930s, it was used a film studio, and was finally demolished in the 1970s to give space for new industry premises.

ASEA acquired a majority of the company in 1916, and Erik Sundblad was designated CEO. Royalties were ceased in 1944.

In 1995, it was estimated that the Ljungström air preheater had sold tens of thousands of units for in total some 20 billion dollars.

== Shale oil extraction ==
During the resource scarcity of World War II, Fredrik Ljungström's innovative technology for shale oil extraction underground gasification by electrical energy, called the Ljungström method, provided a significant strategical impact for the Royal Swedish Navy and Air Force. Fredrik Ljungström obtained his last patent in this industry in 1954. The Ljungström fields outside Örebro, with a war production of about 70,000 m^{3}, were inactivated after the war but with a possibility of reactivation in case of renewed need of domestic oil source. While the project was initially supported by Vattenfall, eventually Svenska Skifferolje AB (SSAB) was employed with maintaining the Ljungström fields, which remained in active production until 1966.

== Naval engineering ==
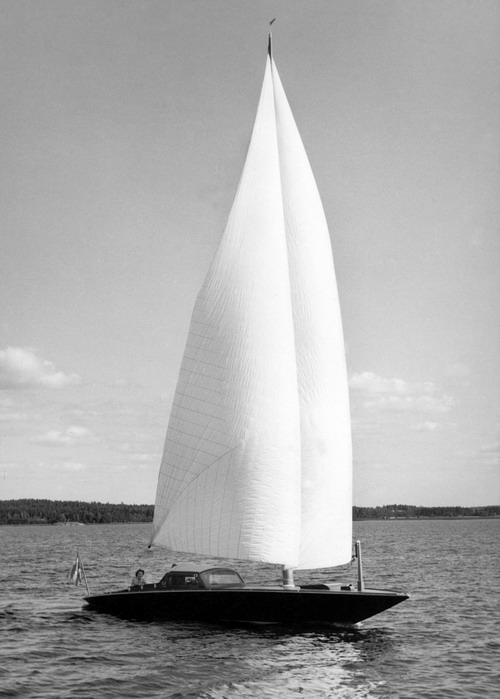
Ljungström sailboat, 1950. USPTO No. 2107303 (manufactured 8 February 8, 1938).

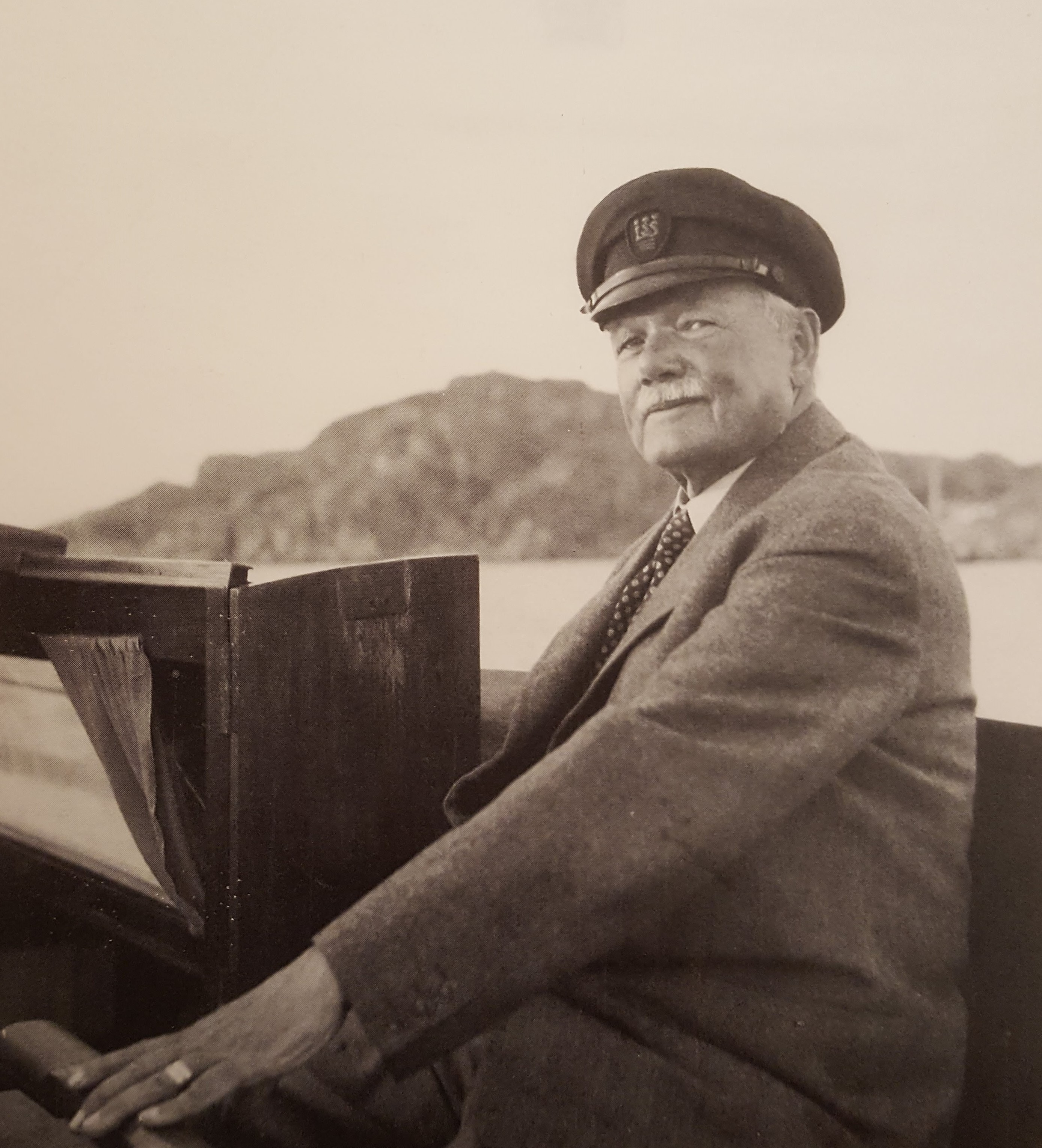
Fredrik Ljungström the yacht designer in Life magazine (1951), onboard Vingen XII (the "Wing" XII), wearing his mariner cap from the Lysekil Yacht Club.

Fredrik Ljungström, an enthusiastic sailor and keen member of the Royal Swedish Yacht Club, made several inventions out of new ideas related to sailing boats. The Ljungström sailboat with the circular arc hull and the Ljungström rig, without a boom and double sail that can work as a spinnaker, is named after Fredrik Ljungström. The history of the productions are represented at the Maritime Museum in Stockholm. He also experimented with a vibrationless yacht motor.

== Other ventures ==
The transmission technology Spontaneous gear 1920, an automatic gear box developed by Fredrik Ljungström in the 1920s, attracted attention on the Swedish market, and several private cars were equipped with the system with positive results. A new company was established with this purpose and, Ljungströmsbilen (Swedish: The Ljungström Car). Axel Wenner-Gren took interest, followed by Chrysler in the United States, but both had to retreat shortly afterwards due to the Wall Street crash of 1929 and the subsequent Great Depression. Still, an invention of hydraulic gear saw success during World War II with royalties paid by the United States. This gear was used for Vabis-built railbuses, as well as the Swedish railcars used in Scania. Part of the other technology also moved on to the first Saab cars.

Although initially interested in aerospace engineering (Fredrik drafted a flight machine project late 19th century), applied aerodynamics were never among his main subjects of interest, especially after having lost his son and pilot Lieutenant Einar Ljungström in an airplane crash in 1927. Despite this, after World War II, Ljungström's technology contributed to the first Swedish jet engine, with STAL Dovern based in part on his technology, developed by the company he founded.

Fredrik Ljungström become a well-reputed figure in the 20th century technical industry in Sweden. Together with his fellow at Royal Swedish Academy of Engineering Sciences Gustaf Dalén, the two inventors once came late to a meeting going around town in their coach in enthusiastic discussions on new ideas. Curt Nicolin praised the influence in an obituary on Fredrik Ljungström.

The works of Fredrik Ljungström are represented in the Swedish National Museum of Science and Technology, the Nordic Museum, the Swedish Railway Museum, the Maritime Museum, the Nobel Museum, and the Lidingö Museum, among others.

== Image gallery ==
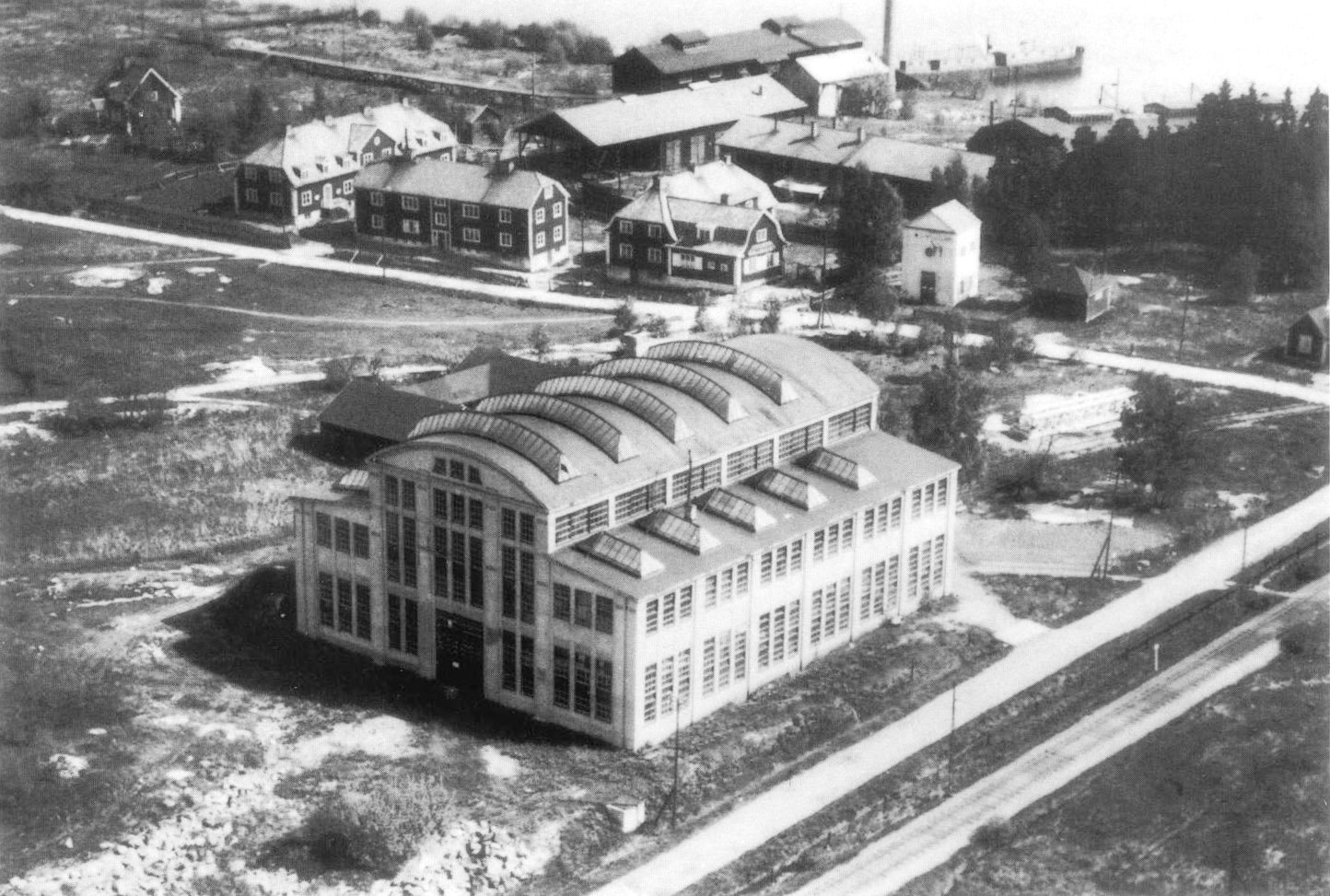
Ljungström steam turbine locomotive prototype workshop and factory at Gåshaga, Lidingö.

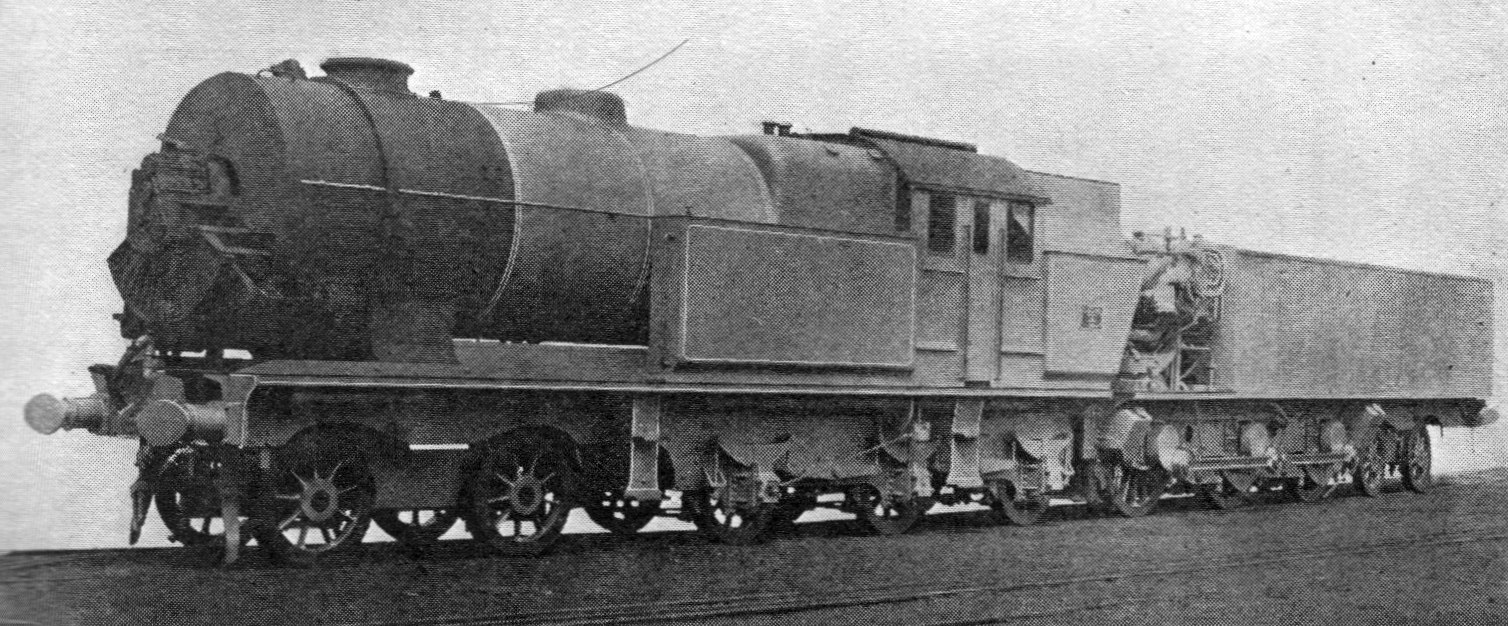
Ljungström locomotive from the Wonder Book of Engineering Wonders (1931).

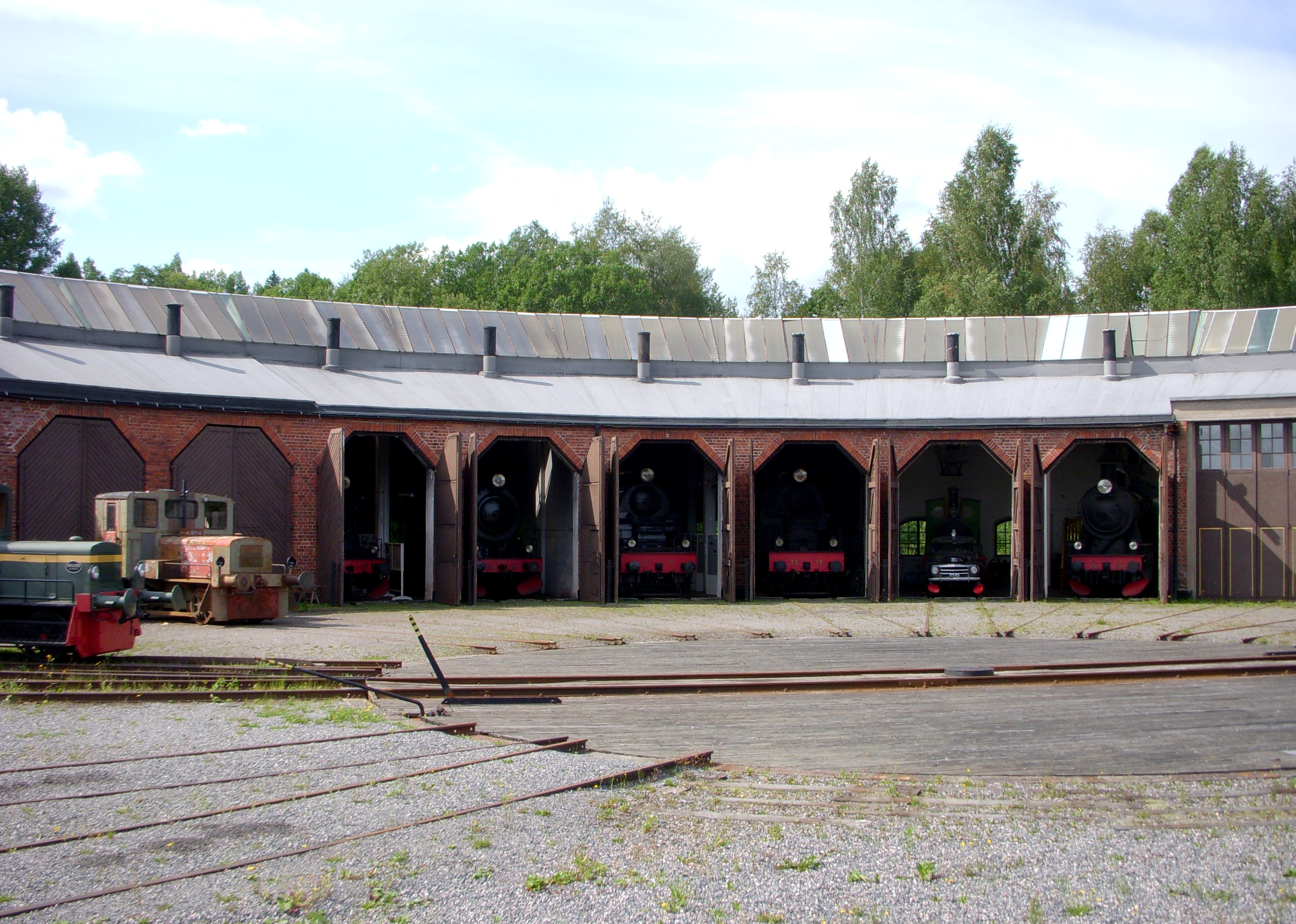
Ljungström locomotives stationed at Railway Museum of Grängesberg.

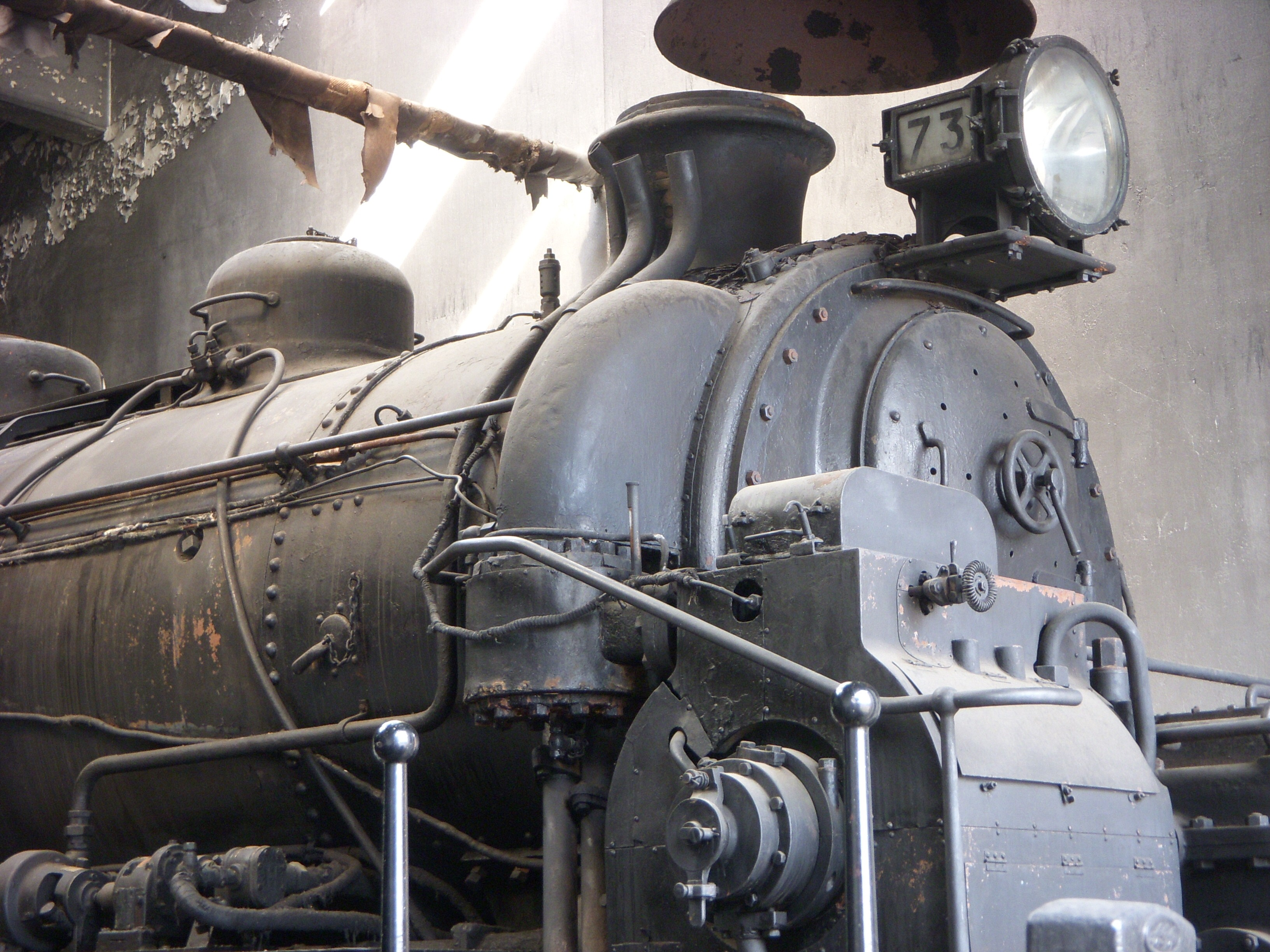
Ljungström system equipped turbine locomotive M3t nr 71 at the Railway Museum of Grängesberg.

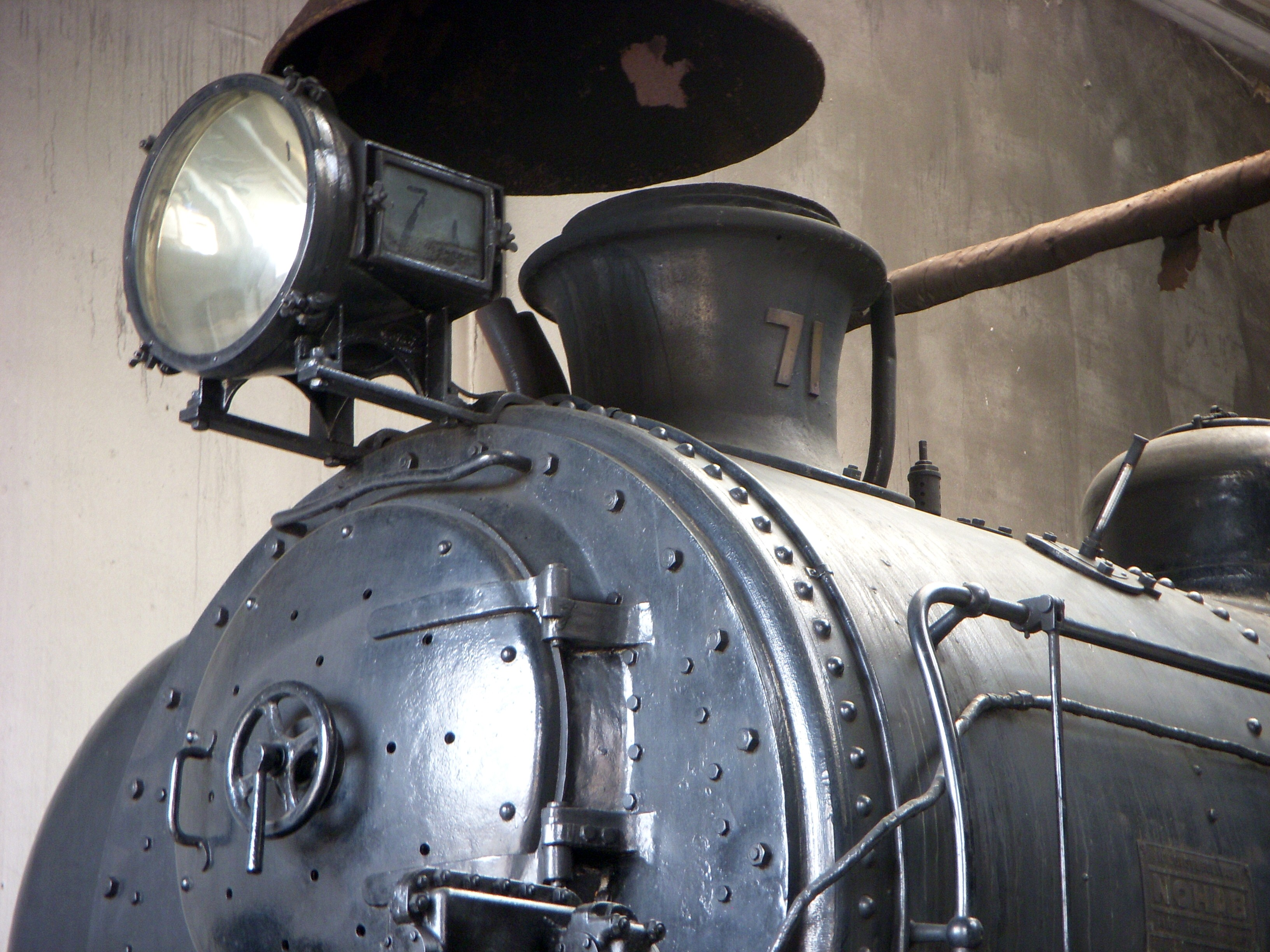
Details on M3t nr 71.

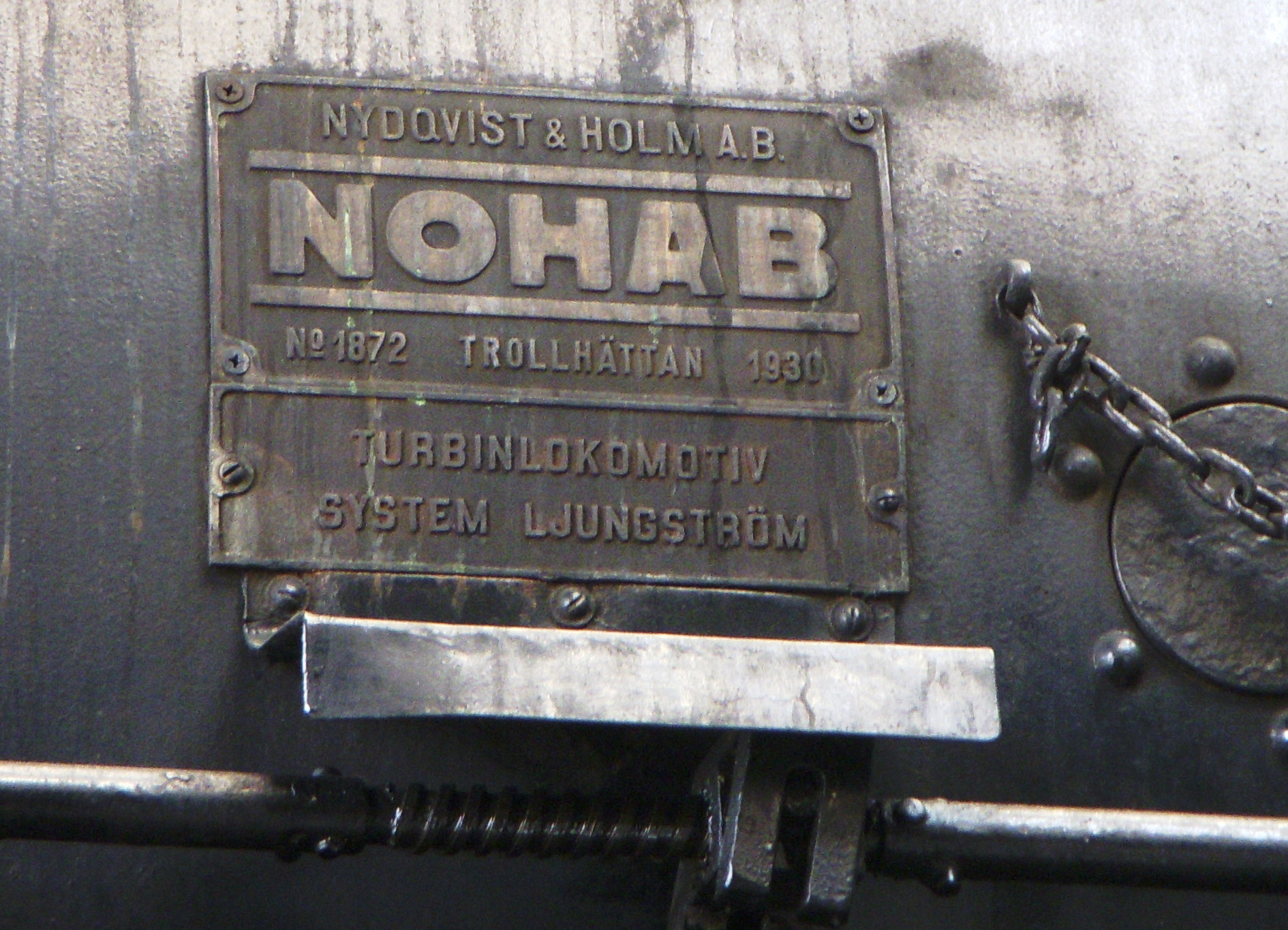
Detail: Turbinlokomotiv System Ljungström.

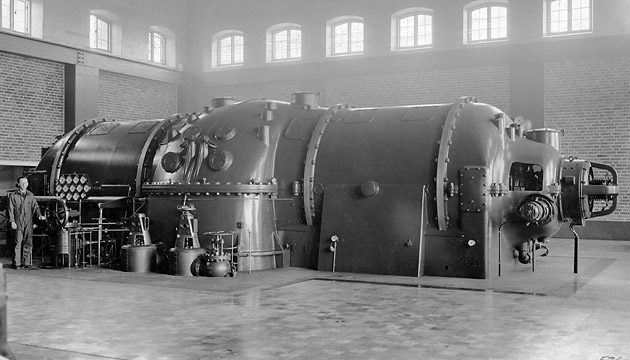
STAL turbine generator (1932).

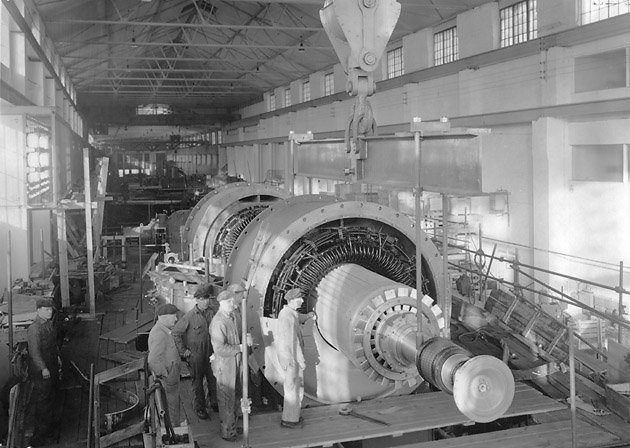
STAL turbine generator (1947).

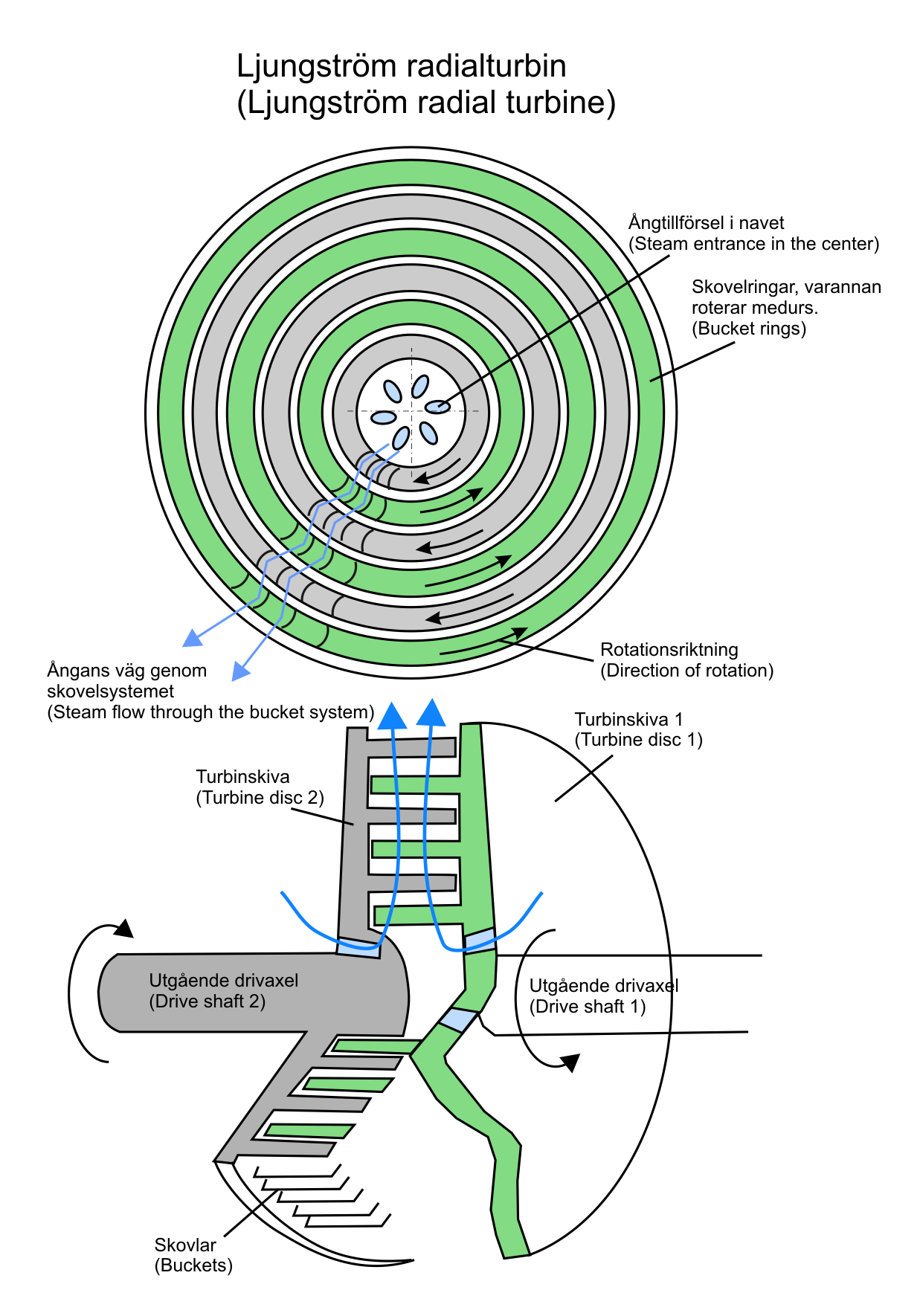
Ljungström radial turbine.

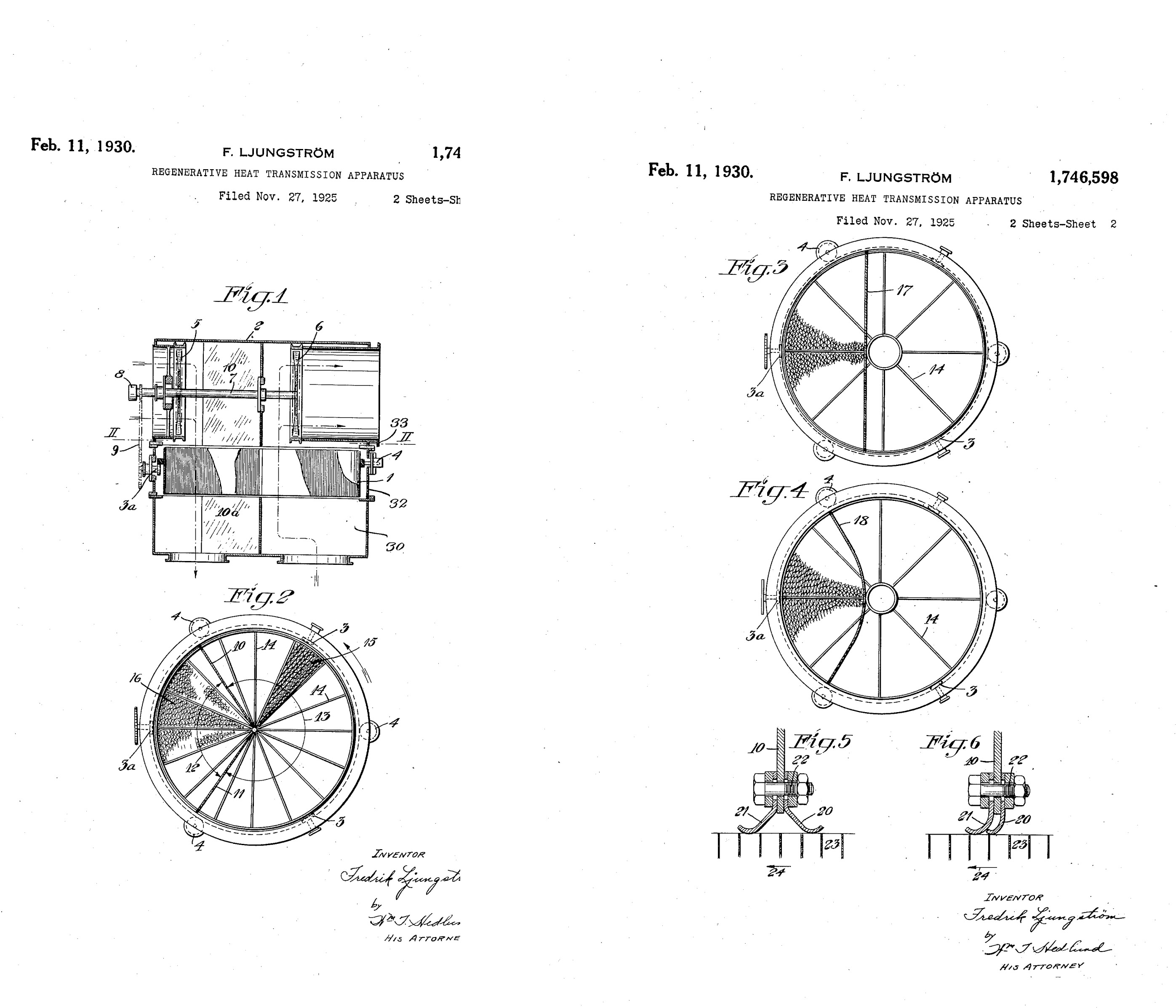
Main patent drawings for Ljungström heat exchanger, USPTO No. 1746598, 1930.

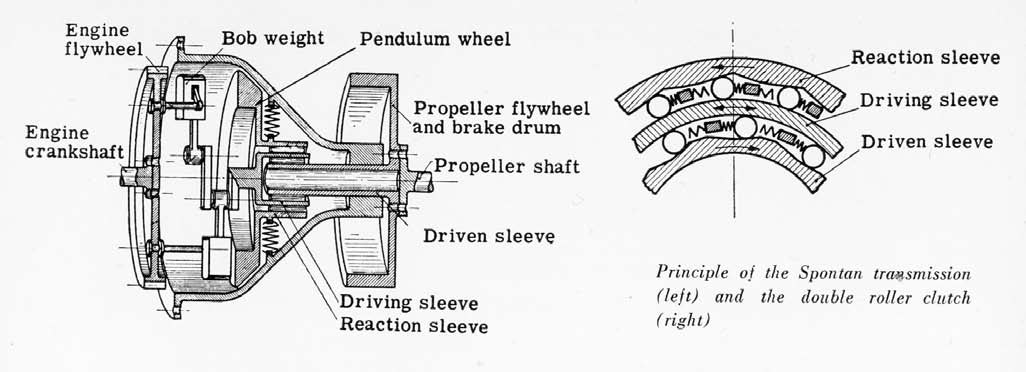
Ljungström Spontan Drive system (1928).

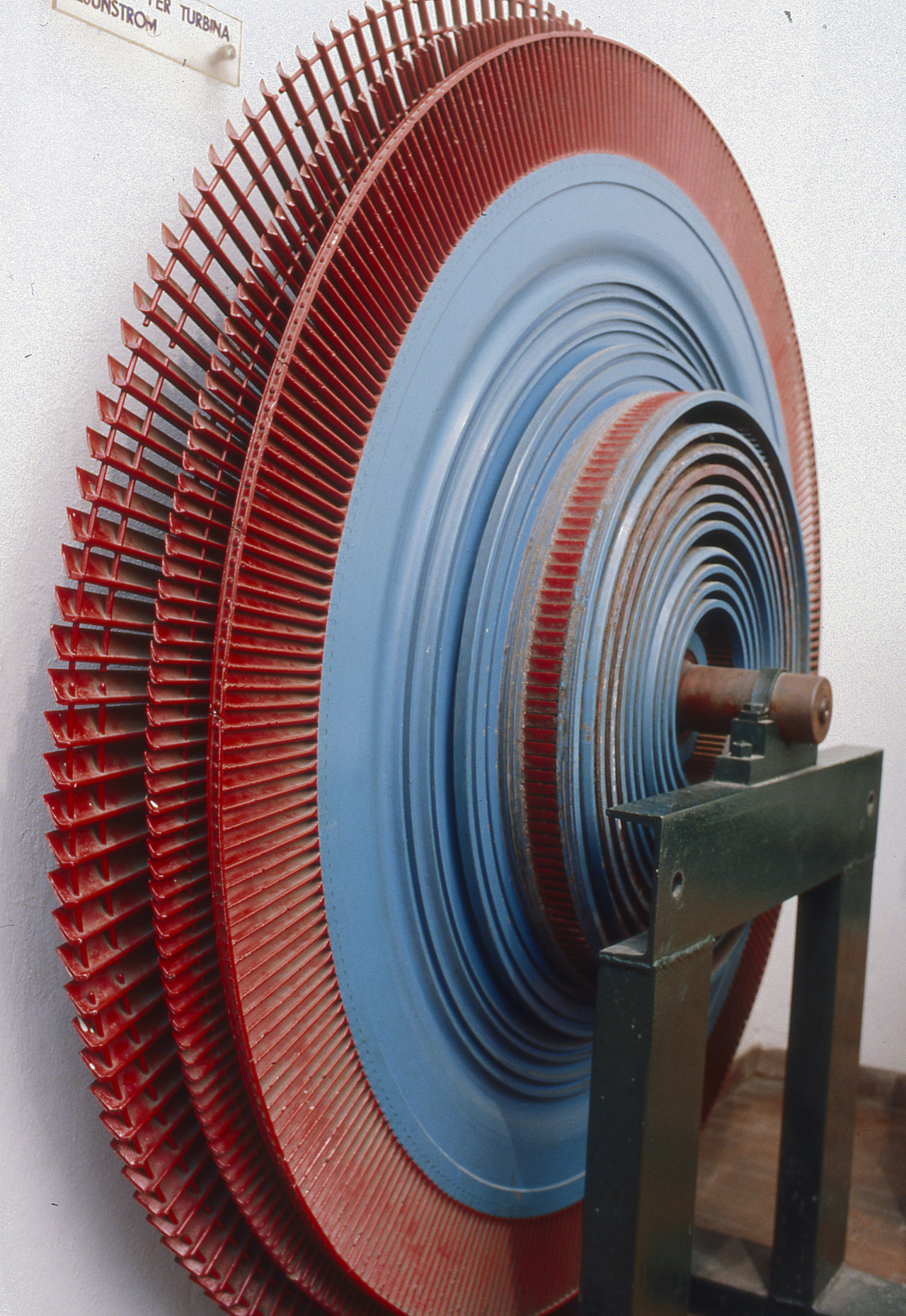
Radial impeller of the Ljungström turbine (1910–1957) in Museo Nazionale Scienza e Tecnologia Leonardo da Vinci, Milan, Italy.

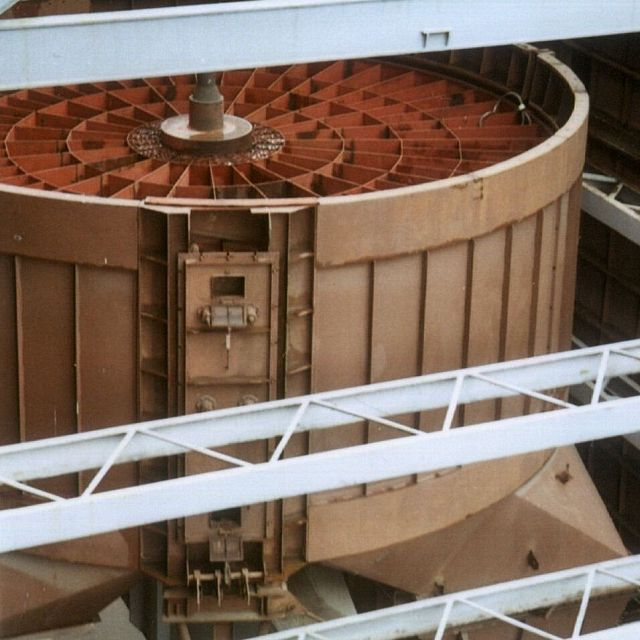
Ljungström air preheater in modern application (2010).

== Bibliography ==
- Studie över fartyg med formen bestämd av cirkelbågar och dess tillämpning på segelbärande motrofartyg och passagerarfartyg, Stockholm, Sveriges standardiseringskommission, 1952
- Unda Maris 1947–48. Tema: Nordisk fiskebåtbyggarekongress 1947, Sjöfartsmuseet, 1948
- Cirkelbågsskrov (Segel och motor), 1939: nr. 5–8, 25 s
- Ljungströms luftförvärmare: Föredrag, hållet vid Föreningens för kraft- och bränsleekonomi årsmöte i Helsingfors den 27 April 1923, Helsingfors, 1923
- Ljungströms turbinlokomotiv, Stockholm, 1922
- The Development of the Ljungström Steam Turbine and Air Preheater by Dr. Fredrik Ljungström, Proceedings of the Institution of Mechanical Engineers, volume 160, issue 1 (1 June 1949)

== Distinctions ==
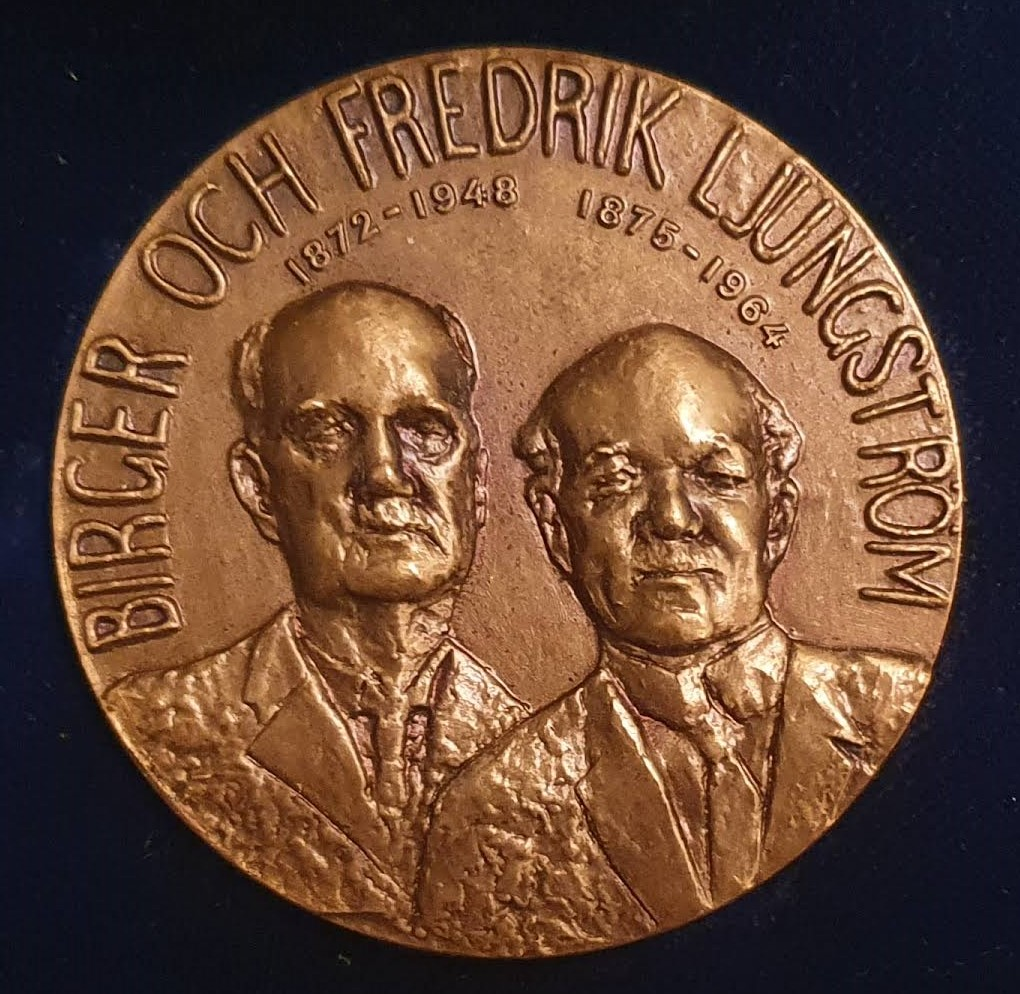
Eponymous Birger and Fredrik Ljungström Commemorative Medal (1976) of the Royal Swedish Academy of Engineering Sciences.

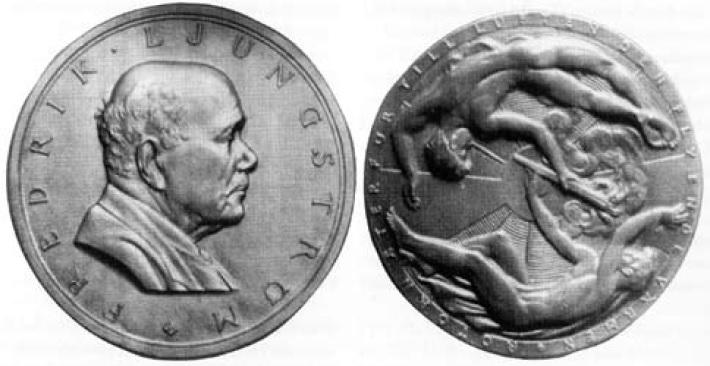
Medal (1957) of the Swedish Rotor Machines, designed by Swedish sculptor Leo Holmberg. Depicting on one side Fredrik Ljungström, on the other side Prometheus and Ariel; figures of forethought and air.

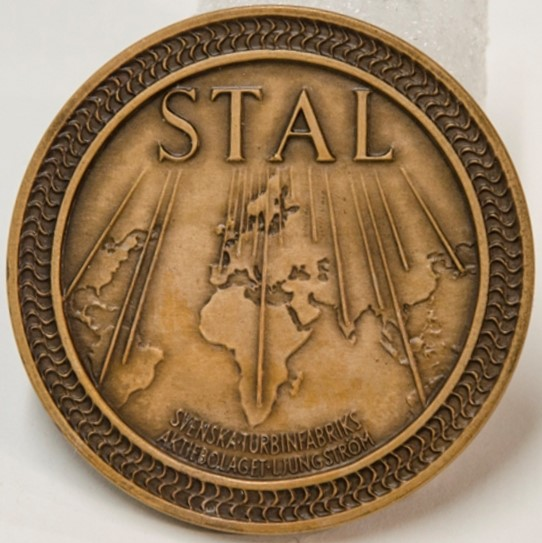
STAL plaquette in bronze. Depicting on one side Louis De Geer (1587–1652) and Finspång Castle, on the other side STAL (Swedish: Svenska Turbinfabriks Aktiebolaget Ljungström). Produced by AB Sporrong & Co. From the Swedish National Museum of Science and Technology.

=== Orders ===
- Sweden: Knight of the Order of the Polar Star (1943)
- Sweden: Knight 1st class of the Order of Vasa (1927)
- France: Grand Cross of the National Order of Merit (1963)

=== Academic ===
- (Sweden) Honorary doctorate of the Royal Institute of Technology (1944)
- (Germany) Honorary doctorate of the Dresden University of Technology (1928)

=== Awards ===
- (Sweden) KTH Great Prize of the Royal Institute of Technology (1948)
- (United Kingdom) James Watt International Gold Medal of the Institution of Mechanical Engineers (1949)
- (United States) International Historic Mechanical Engineering Landmark: Ljungström Air Preheater, by the American Society of Mechanical Engineers (1995)
- (Sweden) Clason Medal of the Royal Swedish Academy of Engineering Sciences (1943)
- (Sweden) Arnberg Prize from the Swedish Royal Academy of Sciences (1944)
- (Germany) Grashof Medal of the Association of German Engineers (1956)
- (Sweden) Honorary Plaque of the Swedish Inventors' Association (1955)
- (Sweden) Honorary Fellow of the Swedish Inventors' Association (1961)
- (France) Silver Medal of the Exposition Universelle in Paris for the Svea Velocipede (1900)
- (Sweden) Gold Medal of the General Art and Industrial Exposition of Stockholm for the Svea Velocipede (1897)

=== Fellowships ===
- (Sweden) Honorary Fellowship of the Royal Swedish Academy of Engineering Sciences (1940) (Fellowship since 1924)
- (Sweden) Fellowship of the Royal Swedish Academy of Sciences (1945)
- (United Kingdom) Honorary Membership of the Institution of Mechanical Engineers (1950)
- (United States) Honorary Fellowship of the American Society of Mechanical Engineers (1950)
- (Sweden) Honorary Fellowship of the Swedish Association of Inventors (1961)

=== Eponyms ===
- (Sweden) Permanent exhibition at the Swedish National Museum of Science and Technology (1995)
- (Sweden) Ljungström Prize of the Swedish National Mechanics' Association (1971)
- (Sweden) Birger and Fredrik Ljungström Commemorative Medal of the Royal Swedish Academy of Engineering Sciences (1976)
- (Sweden) Rotor Medal of Svenska Rotor Maskiner (1957)
- (Sweden) Birger and Fredrik Ljungström room at the Finspång Castle
- The International Ljungström (Air Preheater) Conference in Japan (1962)

== Literature ==
- Turbines from Finspång – from STAL to Siemens 1913–2013 (2012) by Anders Johnson, Informationsförlaget and Siemens Industrial Turbomachinery, ISBN 9789177366300
- Pionjärer vid ritbordet, Enskede: Båt & skärgård, 2000, ISBN 91-970902-6-3
- Fredrik Ljungström 1875–1964 Uppfinnare och inspiratör (1999) by Olof Ljungström, Sveriges Mekanisters Riksförening, ISBN 91-630-7639-X
- STAL-turbin till Tekniska Museet, Daedalus (1994) by Carl-Göran Nilson
- "När uppfinnarna var tidens hjältar" (1994), Populär Historia, Lund (1991), Börje Isakson, ISSN 1102-0822; 1994:5, s. 48–51 <https://popularhistoria.se/teknik/uppfinningar/uppfinnare/nar-uppfinnarna-var-tidens-hjaltar>
- "Ångturbinlokomotivens utveckling", Teknik för alla (1943) <https://www.historiskt.nu/rullande/turbinlok/turbinl_utv.html>
- Svenska snilleblixtar, Isakson, Börje, 1939– (författare) Johansson, George, Stockholm: Natur & Kultur, 1994, ISBN 91-27-03899-8
- Birger and Fredrik Ljungström – inventors (1955) by Sven A. Hansson (1907–1996)
- Finsponga bilder: en skrift utgiven av Svenska Turbinfabriks Aktiebolaget Ljungström (1952) by sv:Torsten Althin
