= Wilhelm Theodor Söderberg =

Swedish composer

Wilhelm Theodor Söderberg (6 October 1845 – 1 November 1922) was a Swedish composer and music teacher.

Theodor Söderberg was the son of organist Wilhelm Oscar Söderberg. He studied at Stockholms musikkonservatorium, qualified as organist in 1867, and as conductor in 1870. He was married to Sigrid Elvira (née Strömberg), and became the father-in-law of the industrialist Fredrik Ljungström.

Wilhelm Theodor Söderberg served as music teacher in Stockholm 1871–1873 and as organist in Karlshamn from 1873. He was the piano teacher of Alice Tegnér.

Söderberg co-founded Karlshamns musiksällskap in 1876 and was its first dirigent 1876–1911.

== Hymns ==
- Ack, varför nu sörja?
- En morgon utan synd jag vakna får, Nr 494 i Hemlandssånger 1892
- Fröjdas vart sinne
- Fort skynden alla
- Gud är trofast, o min själ
- Jag har i himlen en vän så god
- Jag kom till korset och såg en man
- Lev för Jesus, intet annat
- Låt mig börja med dig
- Modersvingen
- På Sions berg
