= Railway Museum of Grängesberg =

Railway museum in Sweden

Coordinates: 60°4′16″N 14°59′10″E

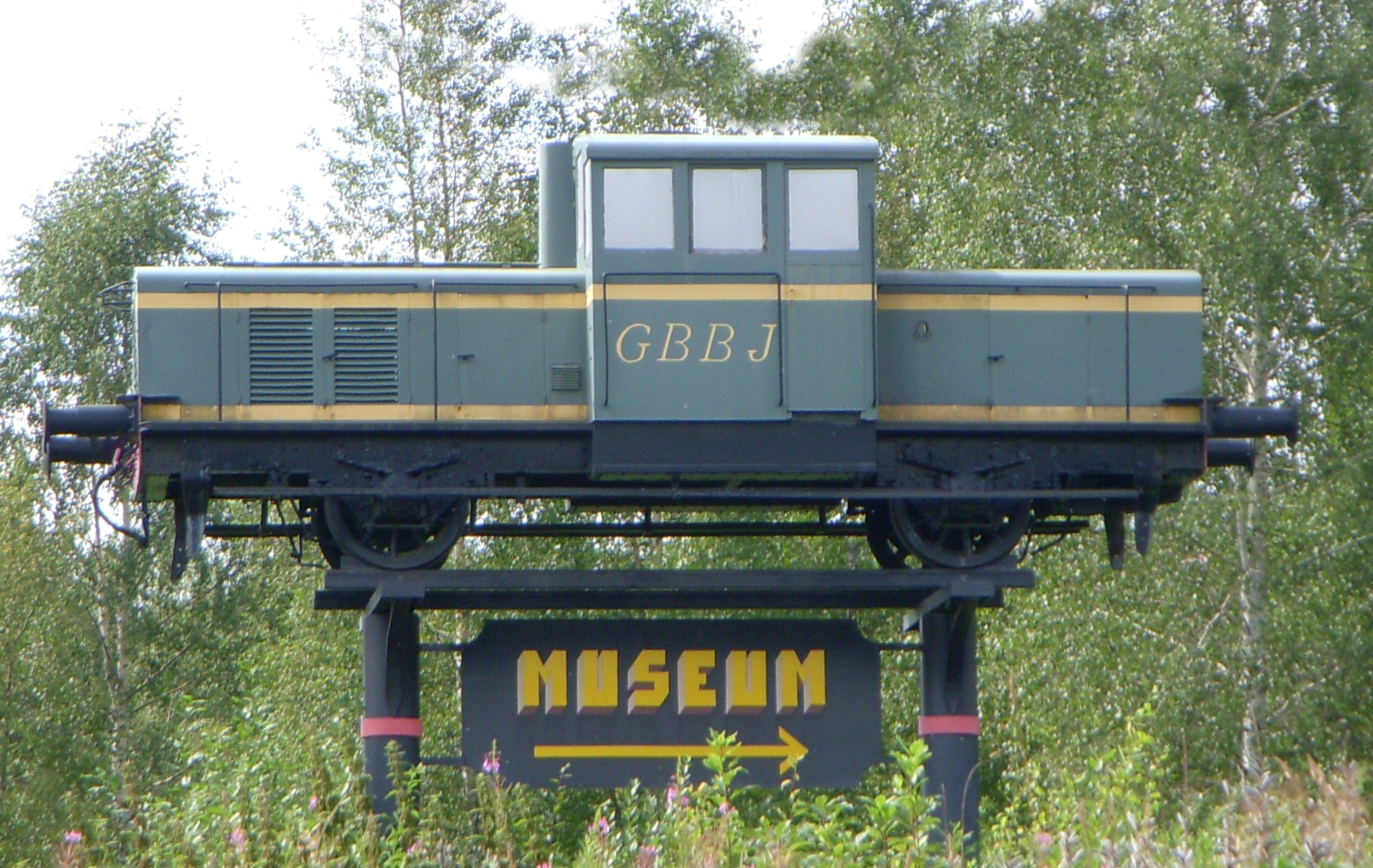
The Railway Museum of Grängesberg.

The Railway Museum of Grängesberg (Swedish: GrängesBergsBanornas Järnvägsmuseum, GBBJ), also called the Museum of Locomotives (Swedish: Lokmuseet) is a Swedish museum of locomotives, located 2 km southwest of the center of Grängesberg, Dalarna, in direction towards Örebro, Västmanland.

== History ==
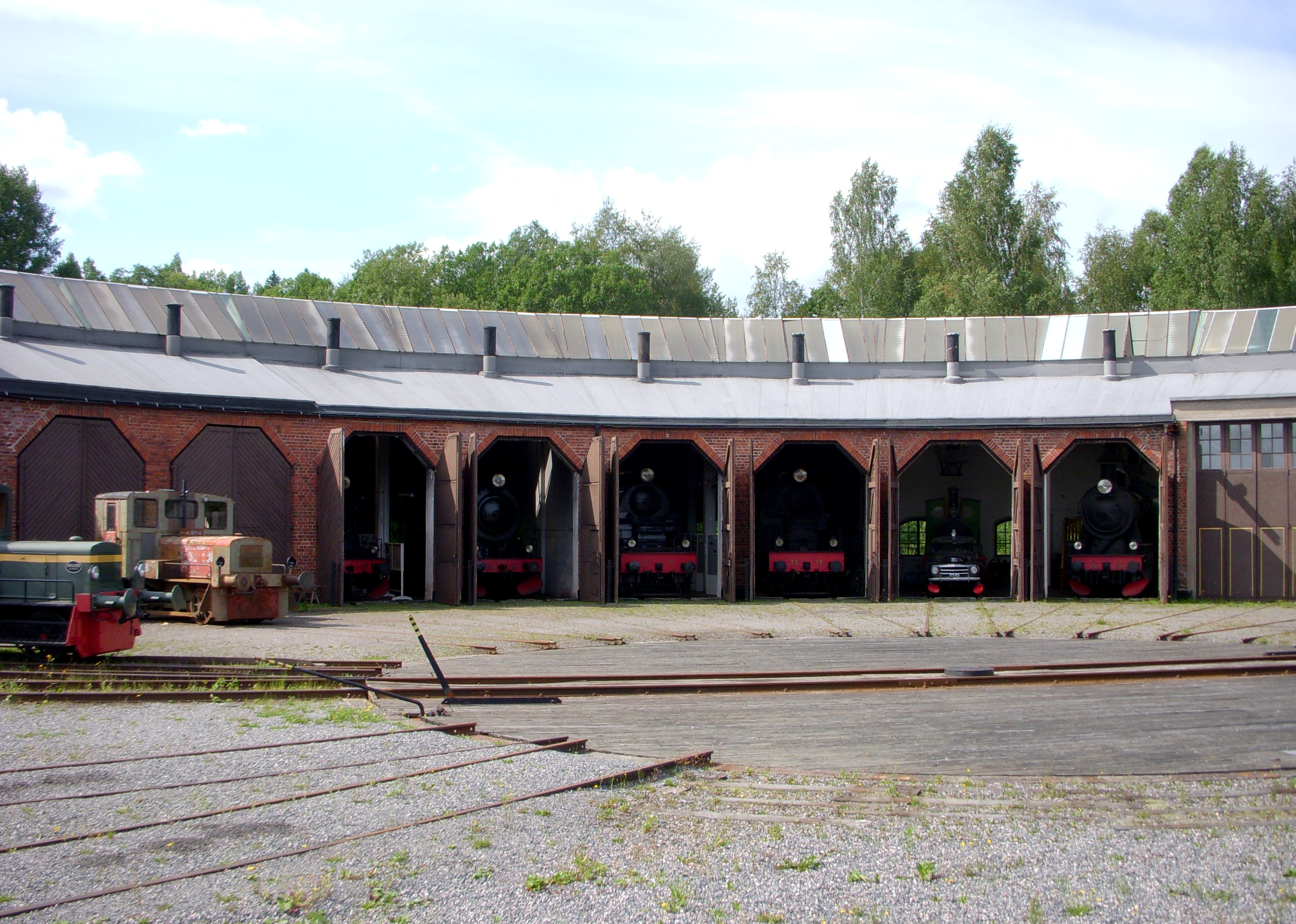
The locomotive stable.

The museum was established in 1979, located in a locomotive stable erected in 1928.

The museum preserves the world's only remaining steam turbine locomotive in function, Ljungström locomotive M3t nr 71, manufactured in 1930 by Nydqvist & Holm AB and renovated by the Locomotive Museum for the 125th anniversary of the Swedish Railways in June 1981. This locomotive was built in 3 units, and all of them are preserved at the museum. With a power of 22 tons, it is still Sweden's most powerful steam locomotive. Practical tests showed that it was able to transport 2,000 tons in 17 per mille elevation.

== Gallery ==
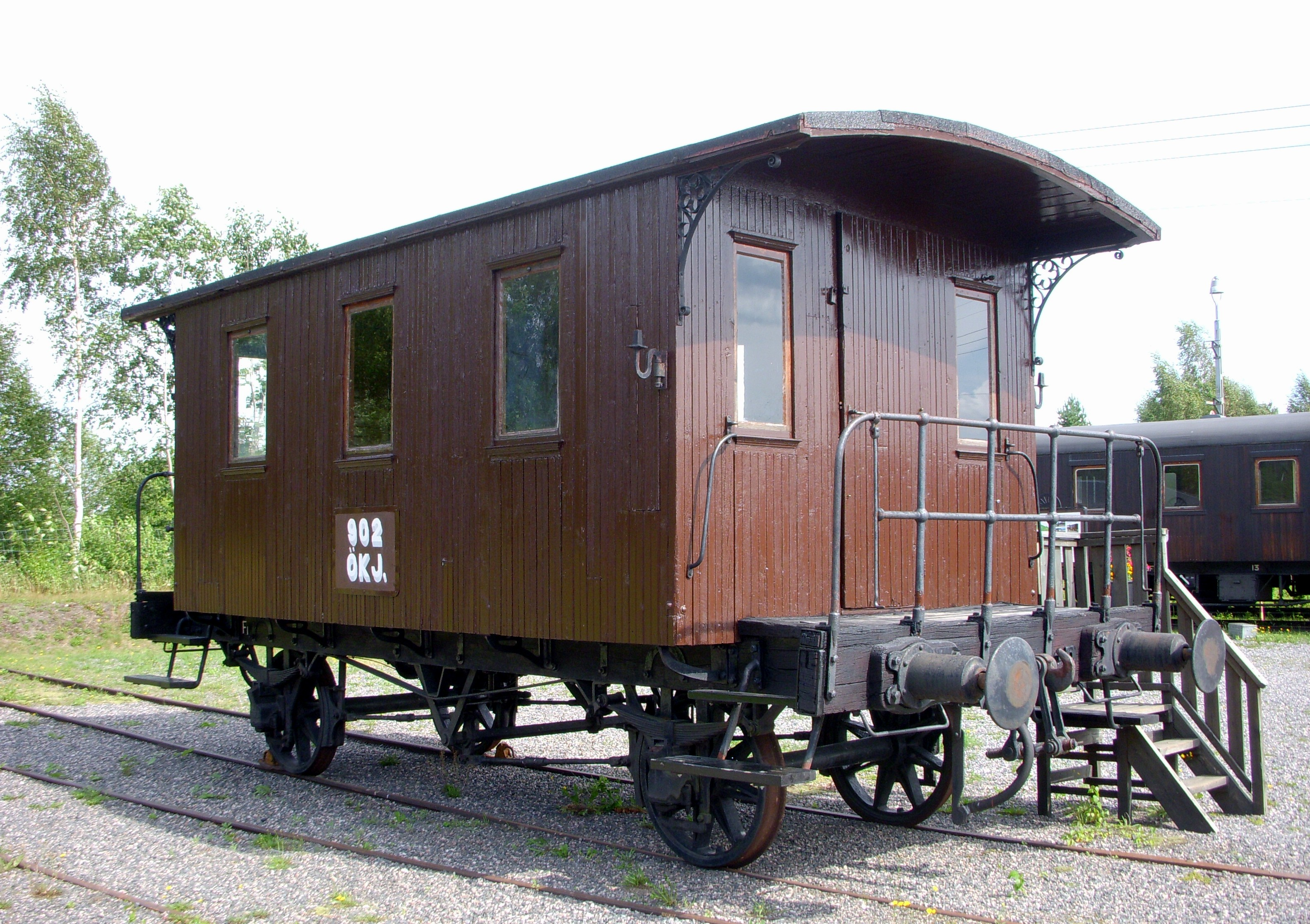
Wood wagon ÖKJ litt F1 nr 902 (1856)

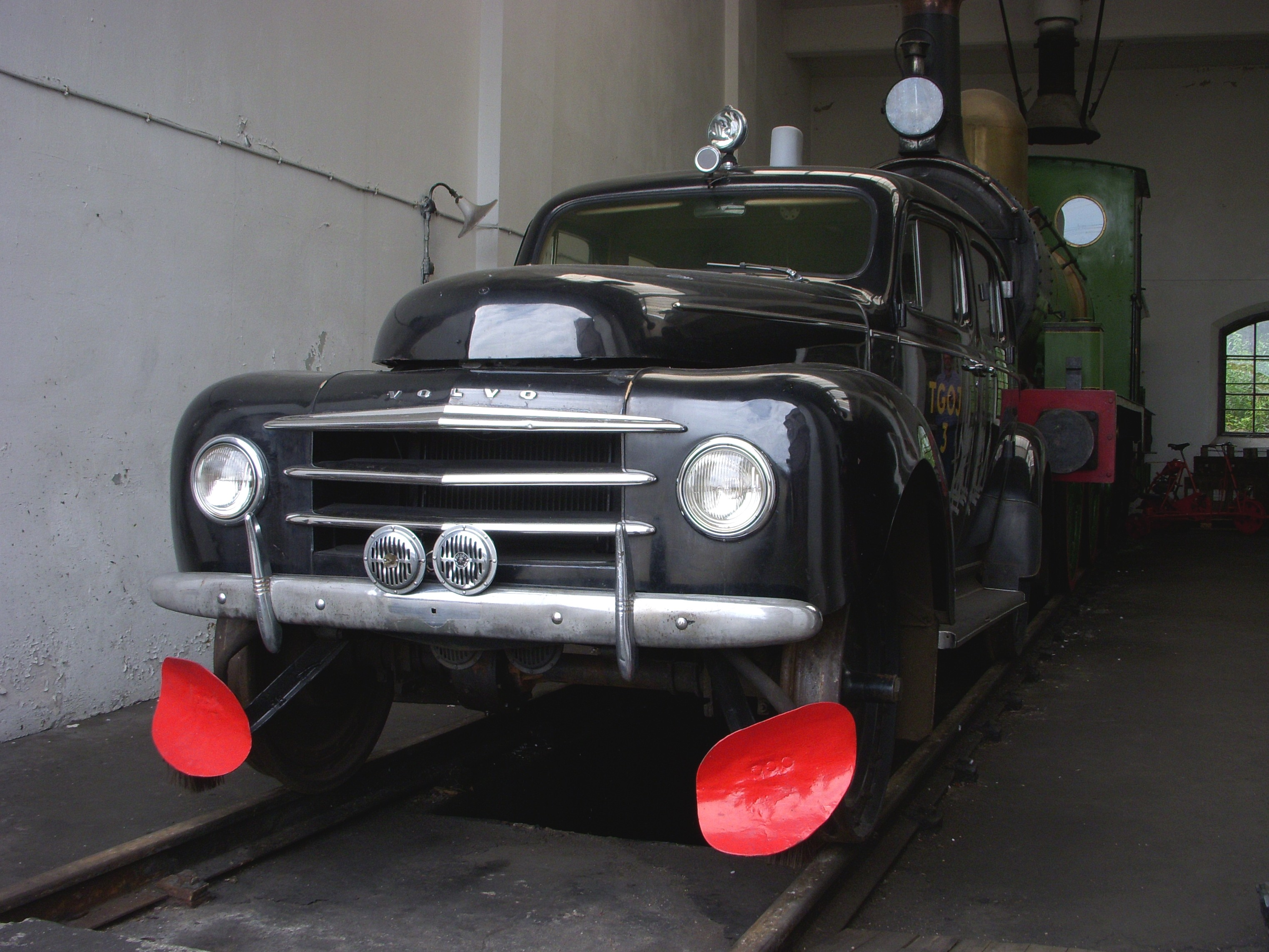
Volvo (1953)

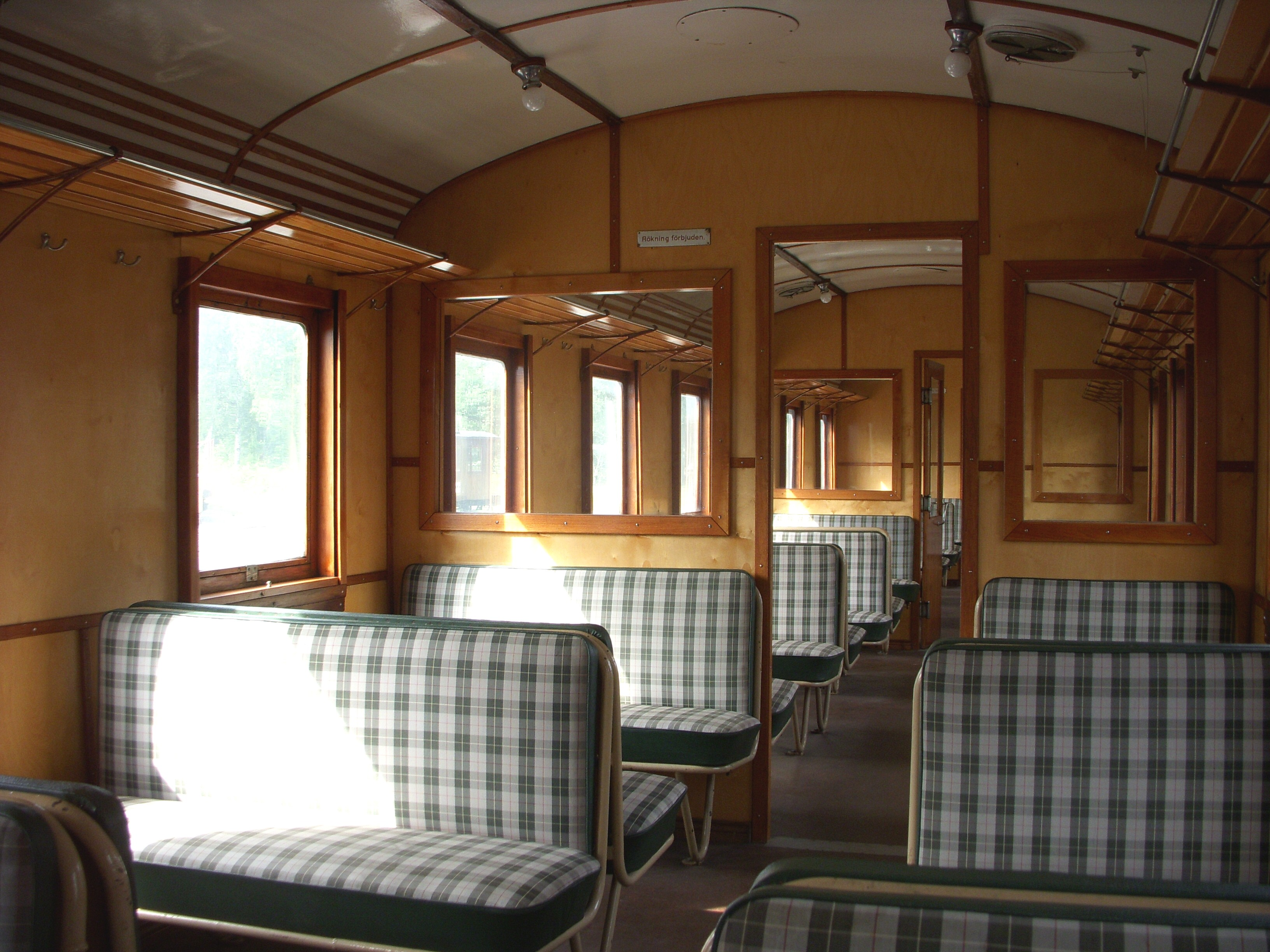
Wagon TGOJ litt Co nr 31 (1901)

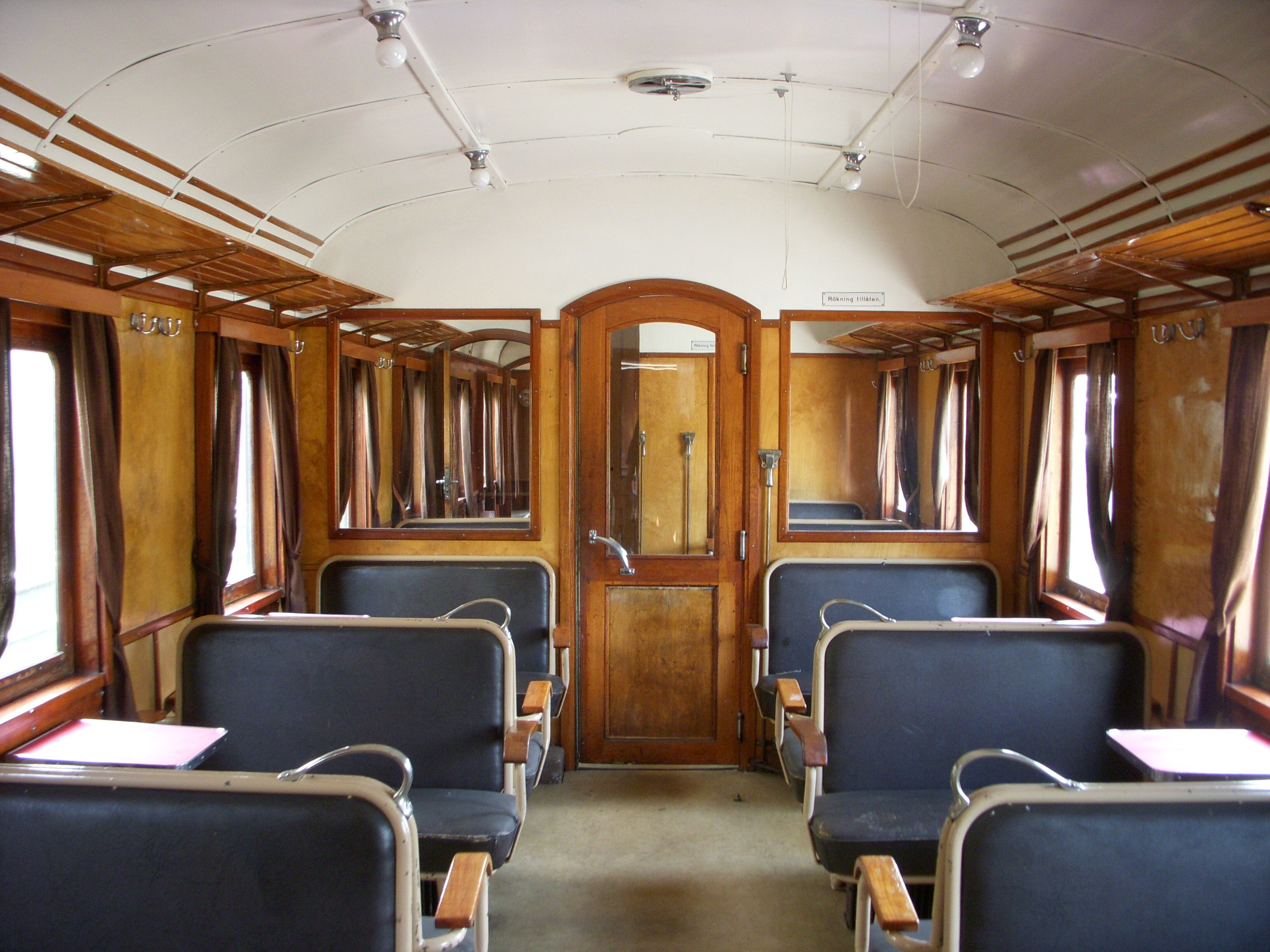
WagonOFWJ litt BCo2 nr 2

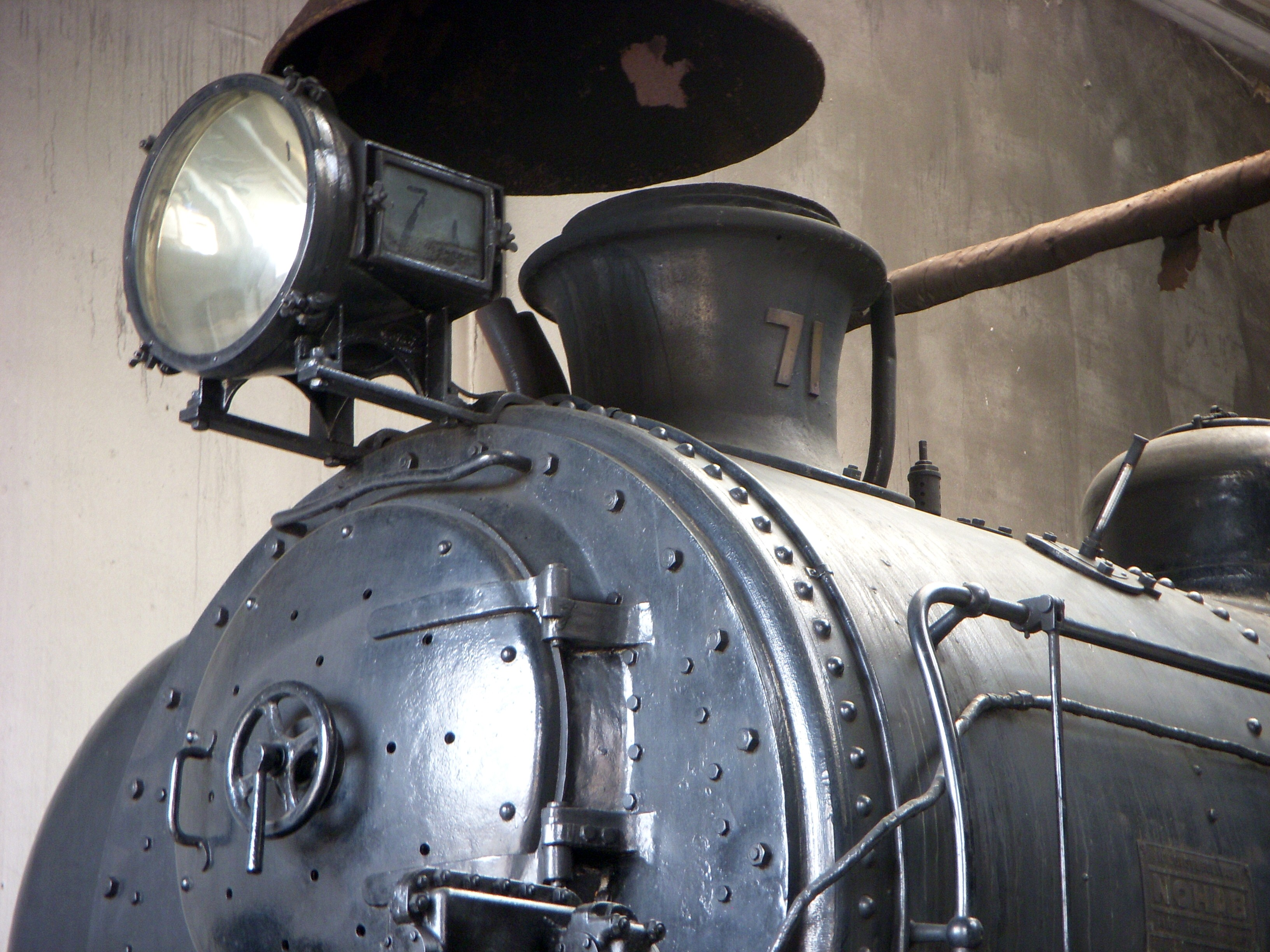
Ljungström turbine locomotive M3t nr 71 (1930)

== See also ==
- Swedish Railway Museum
