= Arthur Lundblom =

American physician (1900–1991)

Dr Arthur Lundblom
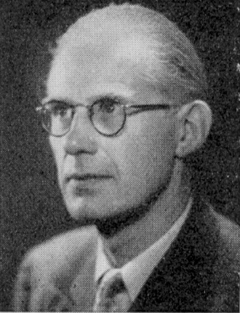
- Born: July 15, 1900; New York City, United States
- Died: April 12, 1991 (aged 90); Stockholm, Sweden
- Education: Licentiate of Medicine
- Alma mater: Karolinska Institute
- Occupations: Medical doctor, writer
- Spouse: Mona (née Ljungström)
- Relatives: Fredrik Ljungström (father-in-law), Emil Carelius (brother-in-law), sv:Claes Sylwander (son-in-law)
- Military physician
- Allegiance: Sweden
- Branch: Swedish Army
- Rank: Major
- Units: Svea Engineer Corps; Life Guard Dragoons

Arthur Fritiof Lundblom (1900–1991) was an American Swedish physician, writer and beekeeper.

== Biography ==
Arthur Lundblom was born on 15 July 1900 in New York City, United States, to Alrik Lundblom, a sea captain och ship builder master at Djurgården shipyard, and Bertha Georgina (née Lindgren). He grew up in New York City, the Azores and on Djurgården in Stockholm, and married the nurse Mona (née Ljungström), daughter of Fredrik Ljungström. Brother-in-law to Emil Carelius and father-in-law to sv:Claes Sylwander.

After Licentiate of Medicine with specialty in orthopaedics at Karolinska Institute, he was occupied as regiment military physician at Life Guard Dragoons and Svea Engineer Corps. He also served as counselor for the predecessor of the National Agency for Education, as a surgeon in own private clinic, as well as with plague clinics in Africa.

As an expert in beekeeping, he served for the Swedish Beekeepers Association in evaluations of bee races suitable for the Swedish climate etc. Besides articles and essays in scientific publications, he authored the book Honungsbiet i Saga och Sanning (English: "The honey bee in saga and reality") (1959) the same year he won "10 000-kronorsfrågan" on bees in Kvitt eller dubbelt with Nils Erik Bæhrendtz on SVT. In 1967 his documentary film Honungsjakt och pilgift (English: "Honey hunt and arrow poison") together with sv:Nils Linnman was broadcast on SVT, about honeyguides and the Maasai people in the newly established Maasai Mara game reserve in Kenya.

Arthur Lundblom died on 9 April 1991 and was buried at Norra begravningsplatsen in Stockholm.

== Biblio- and filmography ==
- On Congenital Ulnar Deviation of the Fingers of Familial Occurrence in sv:Acta Orthopaedica, Volume 3, 1932 Issue 3
- Honungsbiet i Saga och Sanning (Natur & Kultur 1959)
- Stora biboken – människan och biet genom tiderna (sv:Dag W. Scharp 1966, editorial staff together with sv:Åke Hansson och sv:Nils Pellmyr)
- Honungsjakt och pilgift (1967) (together with sv:Nils Linnman)

== Distinctions ==
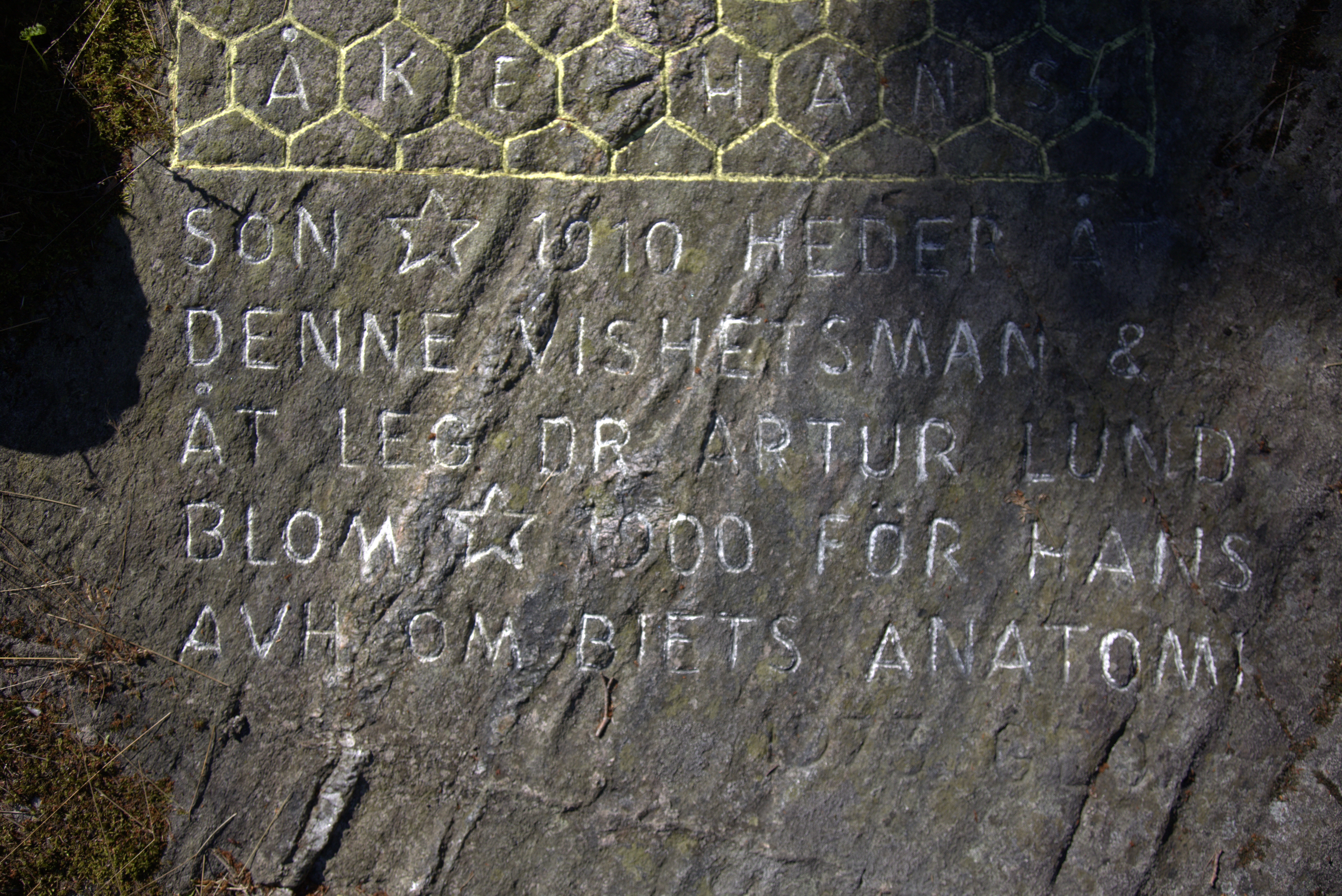
"Honour to the wise man and medical specialist Dr Arthur Lundblom". Homage by the stonecutter and beekeeper Georg Gustavsson (1899–1985) in Bohuslän, Sweden.

- "10 000-kronorsfrågan" on bees in Kvitt eller dubbelt on SVT
- Royal Patriotic Society: medal of merit in beekeeping
- Swedish Beekeepers Association: honorary plaque
