= Ljungström air preheater =

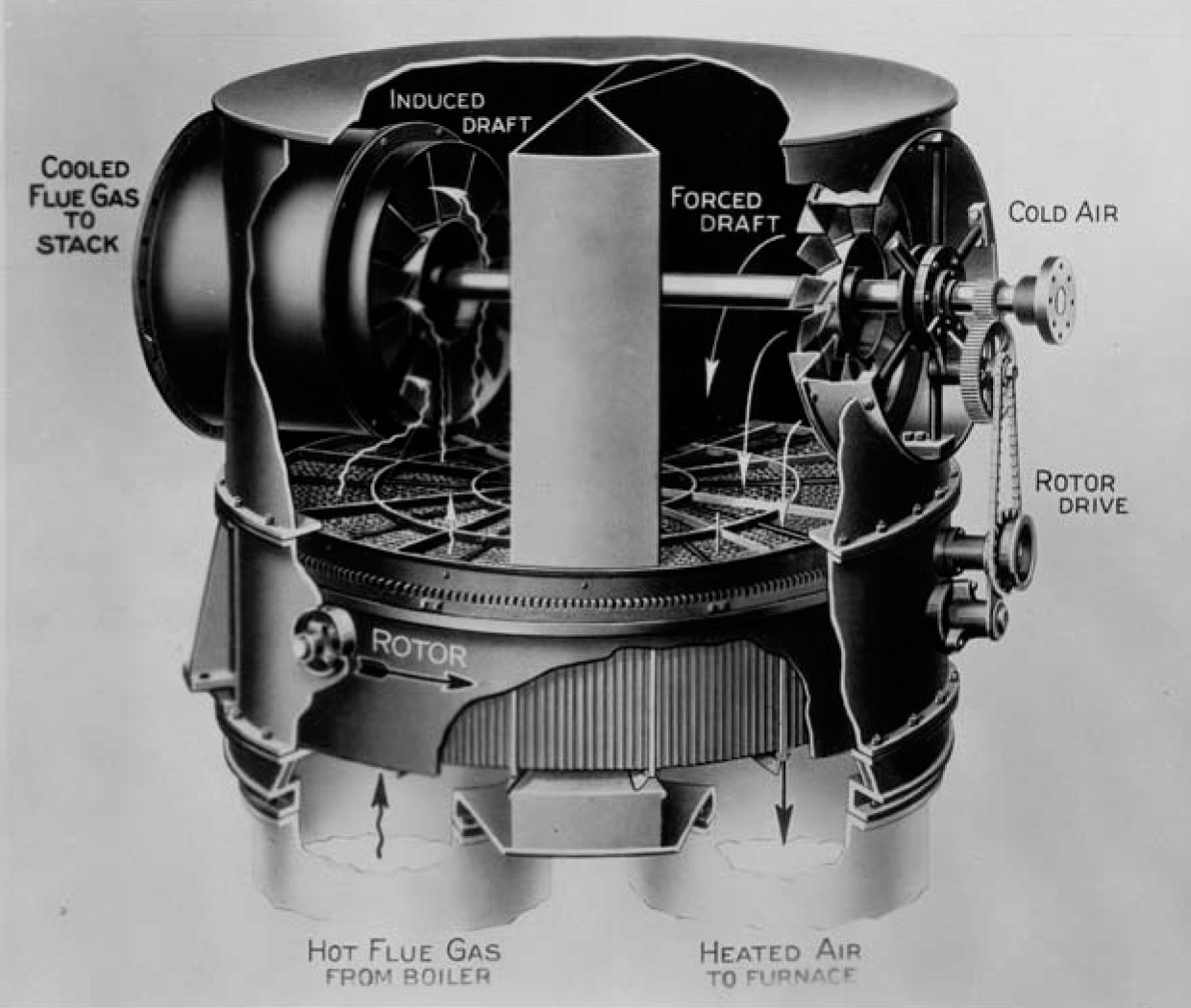
Ljungström air preheater in cross section

Ljungström air preheater is an air preheater invented by the Swedish engineer Fredrik Ljungström (1875–1964).

Ljungström logo

The patent was achieved in 1930. The factory and workshop were in Lidingö throughout the 1920s, with about 70 employees. In the 1930s, the facilities were used as a film studio, and they were demolished in the 1970s to give space for new development.

In 1995, the Ljungström air preheater was distinguished as the 185th International Historic Mechanical Engineering Landmark by the American Society of Mechanical Engineers. Ljungström's technology of the air preheater is implemented in a vast number of modern power stations around the world, with total attributed worldwide fuel savings estimated at 4,960,000,000 tons of oil, "few inventions have been as successful in saving fuel as the Ljungström Air Preheater". In modern boilers, the preheater can provide up to 20% of the total heat transfer in the boiler process, while only representing 2% of the investment.
