= Amanda Sandborg Waesterberg =

Swedish composer

Amanda Teresia Waesterberg (1842–1918) was a Swedish composer.

== Biography ==
Amanda (née Sandborg) was born in Stockholm on 16 December 1842 as the daughter of Carl Sandborg (1793−1862), a cantor at Maria Magdalena Church and the Royal Swedish Opera, and his wife Frederica Cecilia (née Hagberg). At her baptism, Jacob Niclas Ahlström, conductor at the Royal Court of Sweden, was one of Amanda's godfathers. After having received her first music lessons at home together with her siblings, she enrolled in the class choir at the educational institution of the Royal Swedish Academy of Music. She was married to Lars Magnus Waesterberg, and became the mother-in-law of the industrialist Fredrik Ljungström.

From 1875, under the pen name "A S-g", Amanda Sandborg Waesterberg composed hundreds of works. She was also active in piano pedagogy. As a member of the Protestant free church in Sweden, many of her works were sacred songs. Half of the sacred ones were written for one or more voices with accompaniment. The remainder were in four-part harmonies for choir or for congregational singing.

Stylistically, Sandborg-Waesterberg was typical of mid-1800s song composition: a style that continued to be used in bourgeoisie salon music as well as within the frikyrkan, even when it had lost its pertinence in coeval art music. [...] Since she was a pianist and accompanist herself, her piano parts are often quite elaborate and independent from the vocal parts. In some of her songs one can hear virtuosic figurations or onomatopoeic verse, interpretive of the chirping of birds in the coloratura-like ornamented vocal part. Several of her earlier songs relate to art music arrangements of folk tunes. She creates dramatic effects with the use of diminished chords.
