= Torsten Cassel =

Swedish musician

- Born: Torsten Magnus Cassel; 27 January 1907; Spännarhyttan, Västmanland, Sweden
- Died: 30 July 1974 (aged 67); Östermalm, Stockholm, Sweden
- Education: Royal College of Music, Stockholm
- Occupations: bandleader, pianist
- Years active: 1930–1948
- Spouses: Beth Ljungdahl (m. 1933; died 1938) Ulla Ljungström (m. 1946)
- Children: two daughters
- Parents: Edvard Magnus Cassel (father); Anna Maria Tillkvist (mother)

Torsten Magnus Cassel (27 January 1907 – 30 July 1974) was a Swedish bandleader and pianist.

== Biography ==
Torsten Cassel was born on 27 January 1907 in Spännarhyttan, Västmanland, Sweden, to the engineer Edvard Magnus Cassel and Anna Maria Tillkvist. He studied at Lundsbergs boarding school, at the Royal College of Music, Stockholm, as well as for sv:Olof Wibergh. In 1930 he debuted as a concert pianist. He was also active as a music pedagogue.

He was married to Beth Ljungdahl, daughter of sv:Claes Ljungdahl, 1934–1938, and from 1946 with Ulla Ljungström, daughter of Fredrik Ljungström, the latter with whom he had two daughters.

Torsten Cassel died on 30 July 1974 on Östermalm in Stockholm.

== Discography in selection ==
- Solitaire (1946), with members from Kungliga Hovkapellet
- Skogsnymfer (Wooden nymphs) (1946, with members from Kungliga Hovkapellet
- Favoritmelodier 1 och 2 (1948), Torsten Cassel, piano with orchestra

== Sources ==
- Dödsfall, Svenska Dagbladet (1 August 1974)
- Torsten Cassel Svensk mediadatabas
