= George Spaak =

Swedish engineer

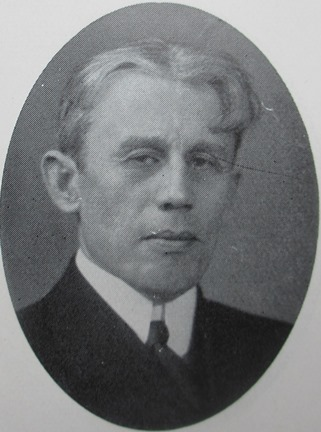
George Spaak (1877–1966).

George Spaak (11 February 1877 – 25 February 1966) was a Swedish engineer.

== Biography ==
George Spaak was born in Stockholm, Sweden. He was the father of physician Ragnar Spaak (1907–1979). He was the brother-in-law of Birger and Fredrik Ljungström.

Spaak graduated from the department of electrical engineering at Royal Institute of Technology in 1897. Around 1898 to 1902 he was employed at The Ljungström Engine Syndicate in Newcastle, England, and made business travels in the United States and the German Empire. He was employed at the engineering agency of Carl Wilhelm Bildt (1854–1906) in Stockholm from 1902 to 1904, and at Bergvik och Ala Nya Aktiebolag from 1904 to 1944.

Spaak was one of Sweden's first private sports pilots with his own aeroplane. He was a fellow of the 1931 Flight Technical Committee of the Royal Swedish Academy of Engineering Sciences from 1924 to 1943 and responsible for aerial security in Söderhamn. He was a member of the municipality of Söderala from 1919 to 1931. He died at Söderhamn in 1966.

== Works ==
- Männen kring Carl Daniel Ekman och tillkomsten av världens första sulfitcellulosafabrik ( (Stockholm: Svenska Cellulosa- och Trämasseföreningarna. 1957)

== Distinctions ==
- Sweden: Knight of the Order of the Polar Star
- Sweden: Knight of the Order of Vasa
- Sweden: Fellow of the Flight Technical Committee of the Royal Swedish Academy of Engineering Sciences

== Other sources ==
- Vem är vem, Norrlandsdelen, 1950, sid. 349.
