= Circular arc hull =

Boat hull design

The circular arc hull is a design for boat hulls created by Swedish engineer Fredrik Ljungström. In the 1930s and 1940s, Ljungström designed and built sailboats, commonly called the Ljungström sailboat.

== Ribs ==
The frames, or ribs, of a circular arc hull all have the same radius. On Fredrik Ljungström's first models, frames were a cross-section (a single arc), but he soon realized that he needed a slightly narrower profile to cope with the sea. The result was that two arcs met at the bottom so that a slightly pointed bottom was created. The frames are tilted toward the mast so that the stern and bow lean while standing straight up.

== Keel stock ==
Ljungström's yachts lack a traditional keel stock. The lower plank is twice as wide. Its curvature is a circular arc with its radius approximately equal to the length of the mast.

== Planking ==
The table planks consist entirely of parallel ribs that begin and end at the rail. The bottom (longest) plank runs from stem to stern and the top two (shortest) are located amidships at the railing on the port and starboard sides of the boat.

== Advantages ==
The circular arc hull's advantages are mainly in flow and manufacturing/engineering fields. Ljungström was an expert technical designer and knew that every surface and curvature change causes impaired flow. Constant radii worked the best. The consistent use of arcs in a hull shape provides maximum stiffness and strength, with which thinner skins can be used.

For boat builders, the circular arc hull has several advantages:

- The planks are parallel planed ribs and need not be adapted to any keel stock.
- All ribs have the same radius and can thus be glued into the same shape. This reduces the effort in jig-building. When the planks are in place, the railing line can be cut.

The completed hull has relatively small surface area for its size, this reduced wetted area also reducing skin friction. Moreover, there are no plank ends that suck water into the wood.

The circular arc hull is very well suited for so-called strip building, where the hull is built of thin, wooden slats as a distance material between fiberglass and epoxy.

== Disadvantages ==
The circular arc hull, as a shallow, V-shaped hull, is not ideal for a rough sea as it does not cleave the waves. However, it can have a tendency to swage.

This lightweight construction has many thin ribs and planks. Thus, there may be more movement within the hull than in sturdier designs.

== Sources ==
- Fredrik Ljungström 1875–1964 inventor and inspirer, the son of Olle Ljungström, the Swedish National Association of Mechanical Engineers 1999, ISBN 91-630-7639-X
- Ljungström boat 75 years old, by Dr. Olle Ljungström, 2008, self-published.
