= Finspång Castle =

Coordinates: 58°42′35″N 15°46′15″E

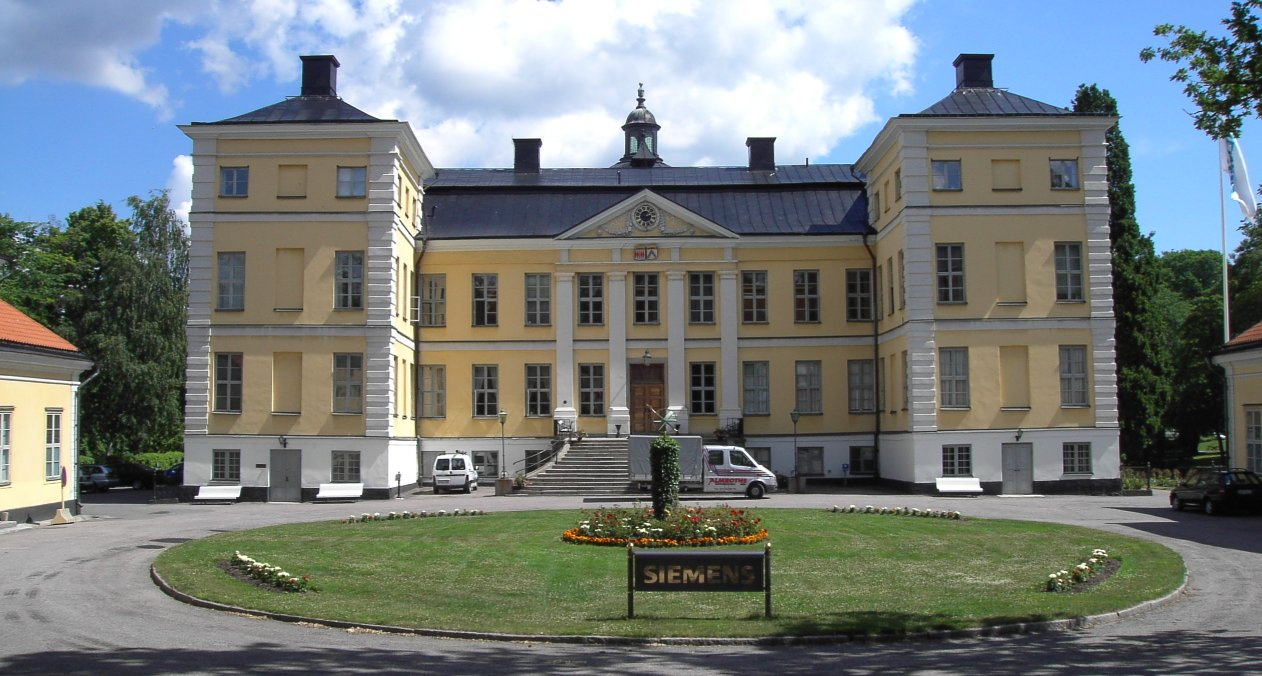
Finspång Castle 2005

Finspång Castle is situated in Finspång, the province of Östergötland, Sweden. Work on the castle was begun in 1666, by Louis De Geer (1587–1652). It is designed in the Architecture of the Netherlands Classicist style by Dutch architect Adriaan Dortsman.

== Notable people ==
- Louis Gerhard De Geer (1818–1896) a Swedish statesman and writer; 1st Prime Minister of Sweden.
