= Aleksander Zawadzki (naturalist) =

Polish naturalist (1798–1868)

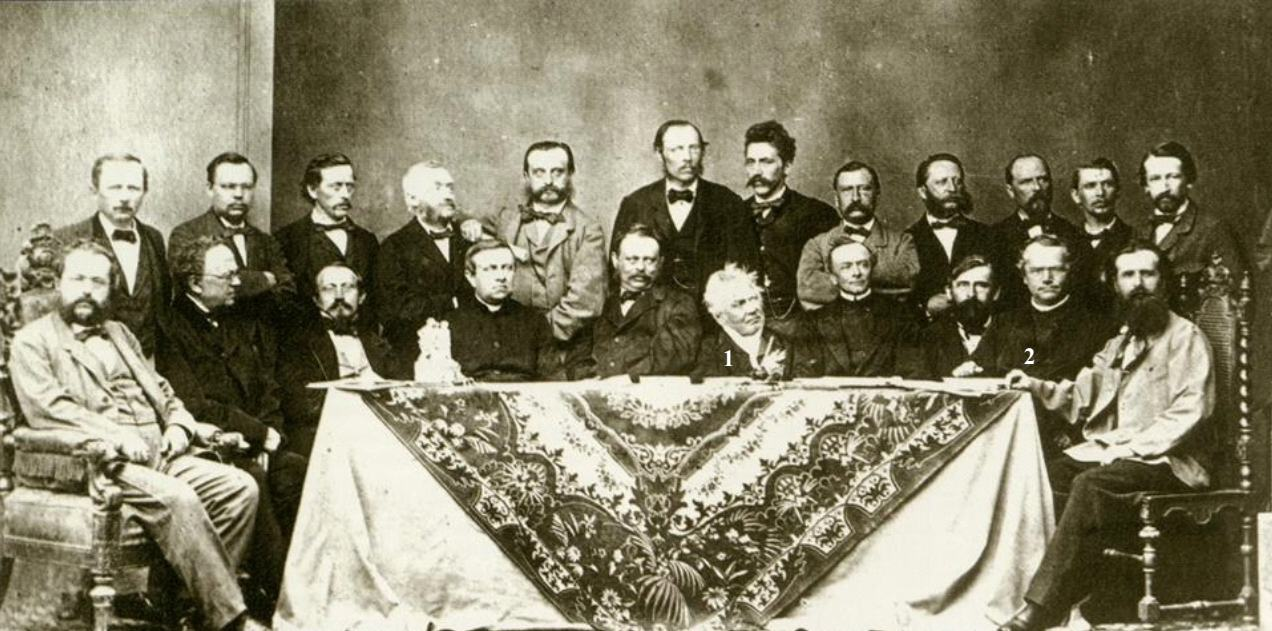
- Faculty of Brno Technical College in 1864, seated sixth from left is Alexander Zawadzki and ninth is Gregor Mendel
- Born: Józef Antoni Zawadzki; 6 May 1798; Bielitz, Austrian Silesia
- Died: 5 June 1868 (aged 70); Brno, Austria-Hungary
- Citizenship: Austrian
- Occupation: Naturalist

Aleksander Zawadzki born Józef Antoni Zawadzki (6 May 1798 in Bielitz, Austrian Silesia – 6 May 1868 in Brno) was an ethnically Polish naturalist who lived almost all his life in the Austrian Empire. He was an author of flora and fauna lists of the Galicia region and the neighbourhood of Lviv (Polish: Lwów). He was also the first scientist who studied and catalogued the beetles and butterflies of Eastern Galicia. He was responsible for encouraging Gregor Mendel to study genetics at Brno.

== Biography ==
Zawadzki was born in Bielsko (Bielitz under Austria). He received some education from Joseph Seyfert in his free time while also introducing him to the study of natural history. After school he moved to Olomouc in Moravia where he was a student at the Philosophical Institute. In 1811 his teacher at the Cieszyn gymnasium included Albin Heinrich (1785-1864), a famous mineralogist who introduced him to the collections of Leopold Jan Šeršník (1747–1814). Although he sought to study medicine, his family means were insufficient and he returned to Bielsko in 1817 and worked as a private tutor. In 1818 he walked to Lviv and joined the university as an extramural student. He studied anatomy under Christian Joseph Berres and botany under Ernst Wittmann, joining the latter on expeditions. In 1829 he received a doctorate and began to teach at the Lviv seminary. He became a professor of mathematics and physics in 1837 at the philosophical institute at Przemysl. In 1840 he moved Lviv University where he later became a dean of philosophy. During this period, he collected natural history specimens extensively. He was removed by the Austrian government from the university position and banished from Lviv when he sided with a radical political body of teachers and students influenced by the Spring of Nations (Wiosna Ludów). He then moved to Brno around 1853 or 54 and joined the Realschule under the headmaster Joseph Auspitz who himself was involved in student uprisings. It was here that Zawadzki met Gregor Mendel. At Brno he also maintained weather records.

Zawadzki was a lecturer of botany in 1835–37 and then professor of physics (1849–53) at Lviv University. He influenced the zoologist Stanisław Konstanty Pietruski. In 1854–68 he studied evolution, and in January 1855 Zawadzki gave a talk on "Blicke in die Entwicklungsgeschichte niederer Thiere" (Glimpses into the evolution of lower animals) for the natural sciences meeting of the agricultural scoeity in Brno and Mendel was in the audience. It was around the same time that he became an informal mentor to Mendel, directing the latter's talent to study genetics. He may even have helped Mendel design the experiment techniques and conduct the analysis. Mendel's clergy colleagues on the other hand found Mendel's work comical. Abbot Napp wrote to Mendel that the Bishop had found his pea genealogies too funny and suggested that he cultivated potatoes instead. Zawadzki nominated Mendel to the Natural Sciences Society and became the vice president of the society after Zawadzki's death in 1868.

Zawadzki was a member of several scientific societies, and the editor of Lviv's magazines Rozmaitości and Mnemozyna. Zawadzki fell in 1868 and broke his hip and died after a period of being confined to bed. An 11 foot granite obelisk was added to his grave in Brno on May 8, 1869.

Chrysanthemum zawadzkii and Silene zawadzkii are plant species described by Franz Herbich, is named after him. A carabid beetle Carabus zawadzkii and a fly Dryomyza zawadzkii were named after him.

== Published works ==
- Zawadzki, J. (1835). Enumeratio plantarum Galiciae et Bucovinae. Oder die in Galizien und der Bukowina wildwachsenden Pflanzen mit genauer Angabe ihrer Standorte (in Latin). Breslau: Korn. OCLC 56868672.
- Zawadzki, A. (1840). Fauna der galizisch-bukowinischen Wirbelthiere. Eine systematische Uebersicht der in diesen Provinzen mit vorkommenden Säugethiere, Vögel, Amphibien und Fische, mit Rücksicht auf ihre Lebensweise und Verbreitung. D. Fische. Pisces (in German). Stuttgart: E. Schweizerbart Verlagshardlung. OCLC 61636191.
