= Burkard Eble =

Austrian medical historian (1799–1839)

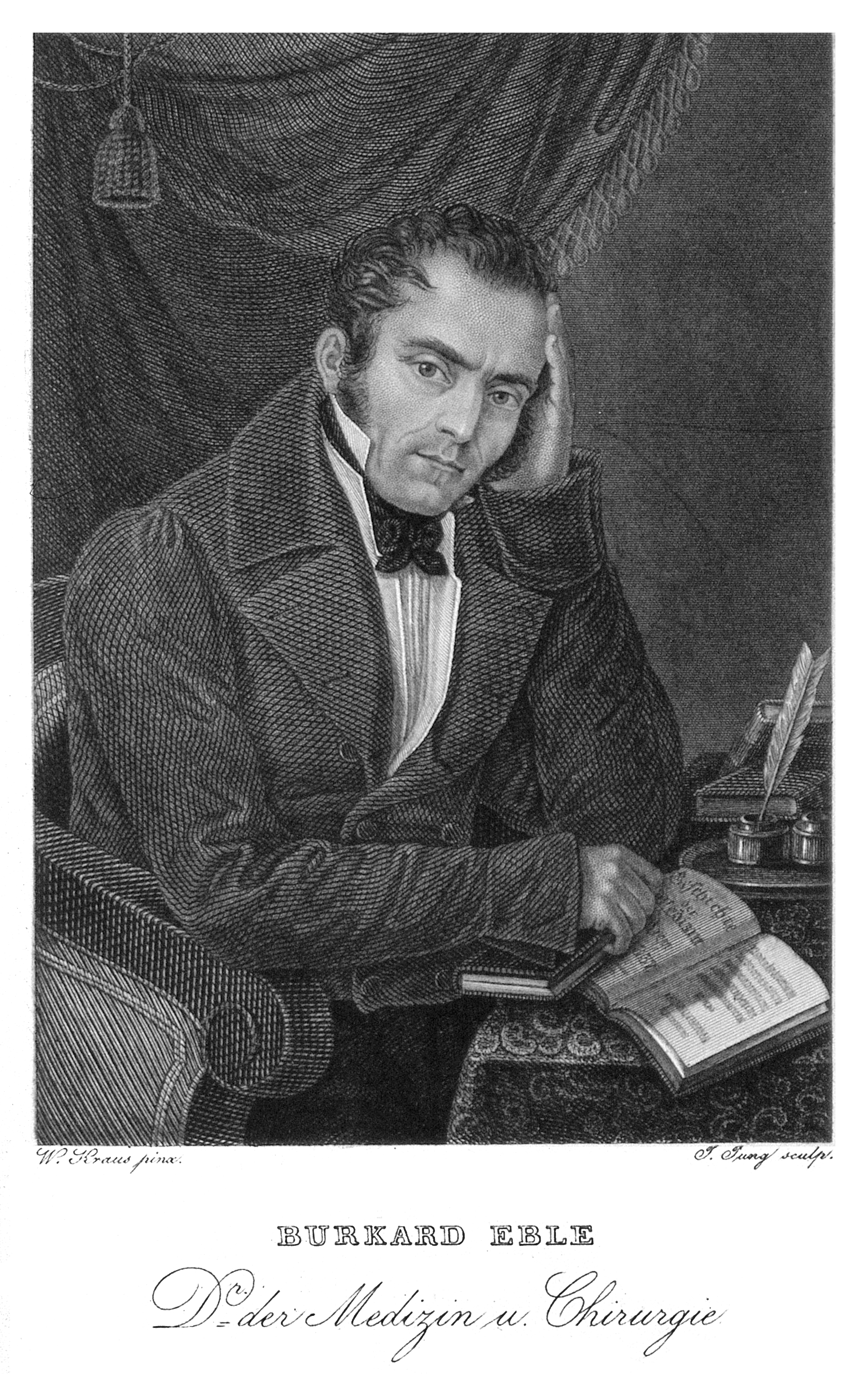

Burk[h]ard[t] Eble (November 6, 1799 – August 3, 1839) was an Austrian medical doctor, ophthalmologist, librarian, medical historian, and writer. He wrote a 2-volume pocket handbook of anatomy and physiology in 1831 and larger handbook for surgeons in 1834. He also wrote on eye diseases, the hair, and a history of pharmacology.

Eble was born in Weil der Stadt (Baden-Württemberg), son of a namesake physician father. After attending the Lyceum in Rastatt, he joined the Josephinium Academy in Vienna in 1815 following the path of his older brothers Dominik and Ferdinand who became Austrian army physicians. He too became an army doctor and joined a regiment in Vienna in 1817 becoming a senior physician at the Vienna Garrison Hospital specializing in ophthalmology. In 1822 he became a prosector at the medical-surgical academy and received a doctorate in 1827 with a dissertation titled Commentatio de studio anatomico. In 1832 he became a Regimental Field Doctor and soon was shifted as a librarian to succeed Johann Georg Schwarzott at the medical-surgical academy. He expanded and produced a second edition of Kurt Sprengel's Versuch einer pragmatischen Geschichte der Arzneikunde, a history of medicine. Unlike Sprengel who merely noted historical figures and achievements, Eble commented on the veracity of facts, declaring for instance homeopathy as being based on tenets that were false. He died in Vienna after suffering for a few years.
