= Pieniny National Park =

Pieniny National Park may refer to two national parks in the Pieniny Mountains:

- Pieniny National Park (Poland)
- Pieniny National Park (Slovakia)
