= Albin Heinrich =

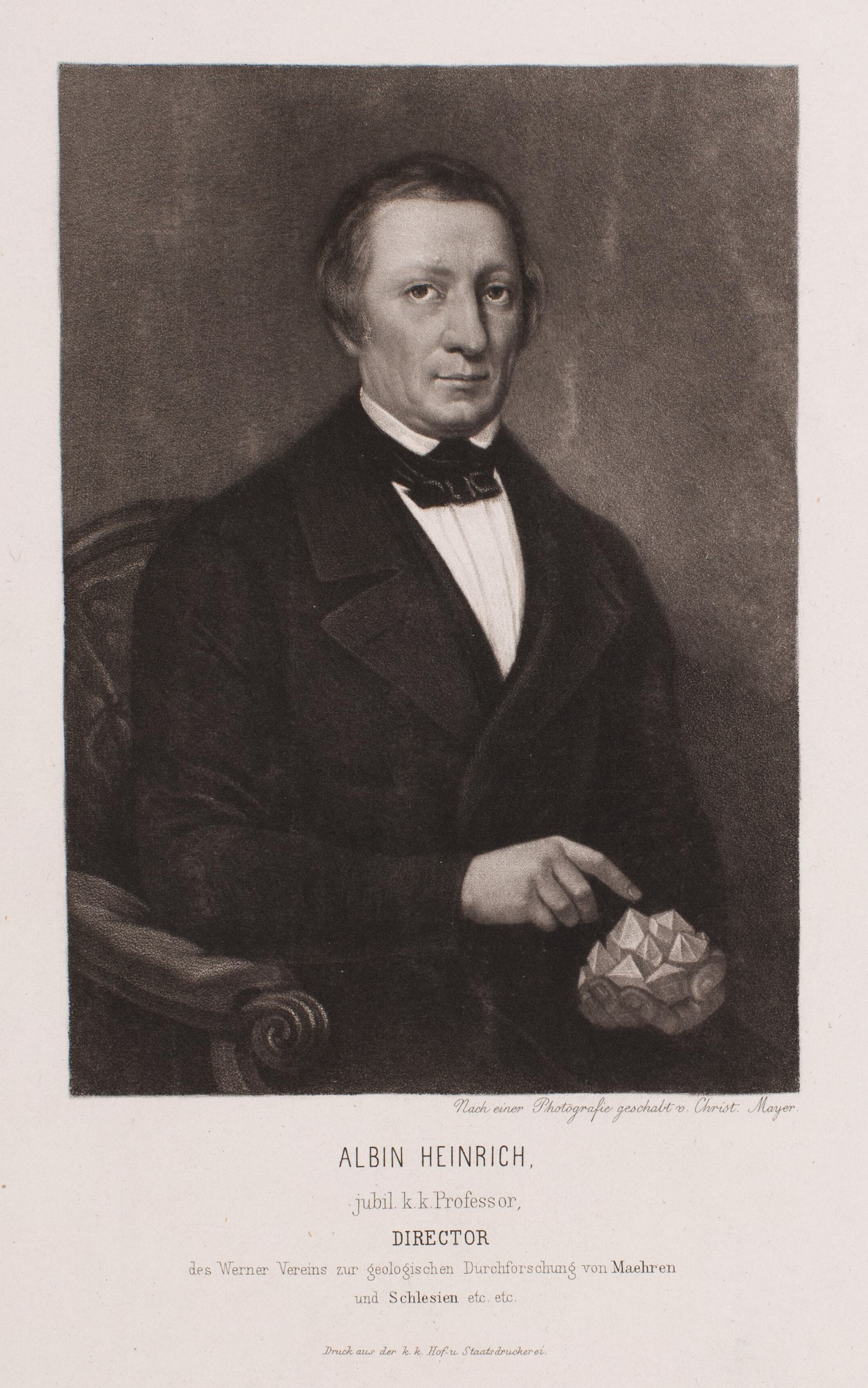

Albin Heinrich (1 March 1785 – 5 April 1864) was a Moravian geologist, educator, and writer of books. He was the curator of the Františkovo museum in Brno for a significant part of his life.

== Biography ==
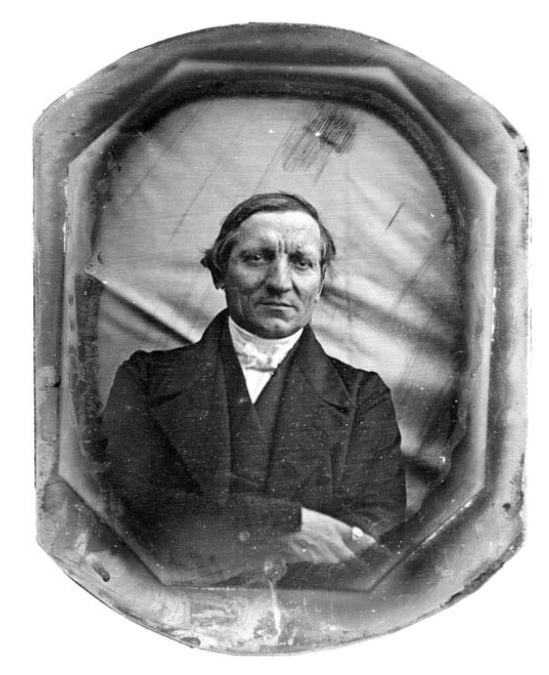
An 1841 Daguerreotype of Heinrich made by Friedrich (Bedřich) Franz (1796–1860)

Heinrich was born in Friedland (now Břidličná), Olomouc. Educated at the Altenburg Gymnasium, he went to the University of Vienna where he shifted from a study of the classics to natural sciences. He went on outdoors trips with Josef August Schultes into Austria, Styria, Tyrol and other parts. He then became a private tutor in Krakow continuing to keep in touch with Schultes who moved the Jagiellonian University. A collection of his minerals was lost during the 1809 uprising in Poland although some that he had given Johann Scherschnik were saved. In 1813 he became a substitute teacher at the Catholic Gymnasium in Těšín and replaced Scherschnik after his death the next year. He managed a library and natural history collection and in 1831 he moved to the Brno grammar school. He became a curator of the Franzens Museum in 1832 serving in that position until his resignation in 1850 due to illness.

Heinrich wrote numerous books on minerals. He founded a Wernerian association in 1851.
