= Pieniny National Park (Slovakia) =

National park in northern Slovakia

Pieniny National Park Pieninský národný park
- IUCN category II (national park)
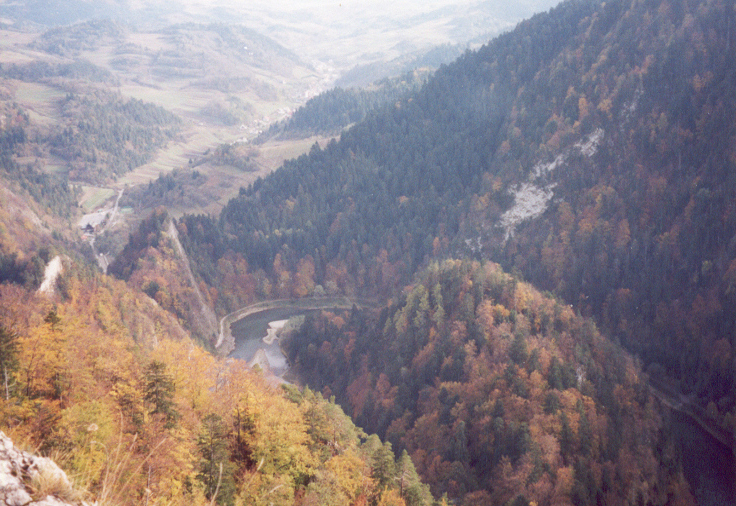
- Dunajec River and Lesnica village
- Interactive map of Pieniny National Park; Pieninský národný park
- Location: Northern Slovakia
- Coordinates: 49°24′N 20°25′E
- Area: 37.5 km^{2} (14.5 sq mi)
- Established: 16 January 1967
- Governing body: Správa PIENAP-u in Červený Kláštor

Pieniny National Park (Slovak: Pieninský národný park; abbr. PIENAP) is a national park in northern Slovakia. The park is located in the eastern Pieniny Mountains on the border with Poland. It is the smallest national park in Slovakia with an area of 37.49 km^{2} (14.48 mi^{2}) and a buffer zone of 224.44 km^{2} (86.66 mi^{2}). The park is located in the Slovak districts of Kežmarok and Stará Ľubovňa in the Prešov Region.

== History ==
The Zamagurie region was already declared as a protected territory in 1932, making it the first protected international nature park in Europe. On the Polish side it was called Pieniński Park Narodowy, while the Slovak part of the Pieniny Mountains was a national nature reserve. The National Park itself was founded on 16 January 1967, which makes it the second oldest national park in Slovakia after the Tatra National Park. By the 1994 act of the Slovak parliament regarding nature and landscape protection, the name of the park was changed to the Pieniny National Park. Its borders were adjusted in 1997.

== Location ==
The park is located in north-eastern Slovakia. It covers the eastern Pieniny Mountains on the border with Poland. The Pieniny Mountains as a whole, cover an area of more than 100km2. The eastern part of it is situated on the territory of Slovakia, the western half belongs to Poland. The valley of the Dunajec river marks the border between Slovakia and Poland. The Pieniny Mountains are not particularly high, especially in the western part of the range. Though this is somewhat disguised by the extreme dissection of the landscape, especially around the Dunajec river gorge. Along this canyon, the highest point on the Slovak side is the Holica mountain with 828m. The highest point in the national park is Vysoké skalky at 1050m. Vysoké skalky is located in the Lesser Pieniny range, which forms a boundary ridge between Slovakia and Poland, consisting of several smaller cliffs. In the south and southwest, bordering the Tatra National Park, the protective belt reaches the Popradská kotlina basin and the Ždiarska brázda furrow.

== Geology ==
The geological foundation of the territory of the Pieniny national park is composed of two basic structures. The western part of the Pieniny mountain range consists of a complex chain of rugged mountains through which the Dunajec river cut out a rocky canyon. Near to the spot where the Dunajec river leaves Slovakia, the Lesnicky Potok brook flows into the gorge from the right side. The Prielom Lesnickeho potoka chasm carved its path through the hard limestone cliffs. It is a gorge, nearly 300m deep squeezed between vertical dark gray limestone cliffs. Above the gorge, the valley of the Lesnicky potok brook is wider and oval-shaped.

== Flora ==
The Pieniny national park is characterised by the distribution of the vegetation over several altitude vegetation tiers. The nature of the whole Zamagurie region has been heavily changed by humans, e.g. the basins have been deforested. Before the deforestation, the basins and furrows were covered by beech forests, which no longer grow in the Tatras with a small exception of the Belianske Tatry reforestation project. The Pieniny national park is rich in rare varieties of plants, including endemites and subspecies, e.g. Chrysanthemum zawadzkii, Taraxacum pieninicum and Libanotis montana sibirica.

== Fauna ==
The national park is home to mammals including the brown bear, the wolf, the lynx, the chamois, the river otter and the alpine marmot. On the rocky cliffs, eagles nest on inaccessible spots and several storks nest in the region of the national park.

== Tourism ==
The national park is known for its natural environment, including the Dunajec River Gorge, which is a rafting and hiking location. The park offers traditional folklore and architecture, especially the village of Červený Kláštor with the Museum of National Culture.

== Gallery ==
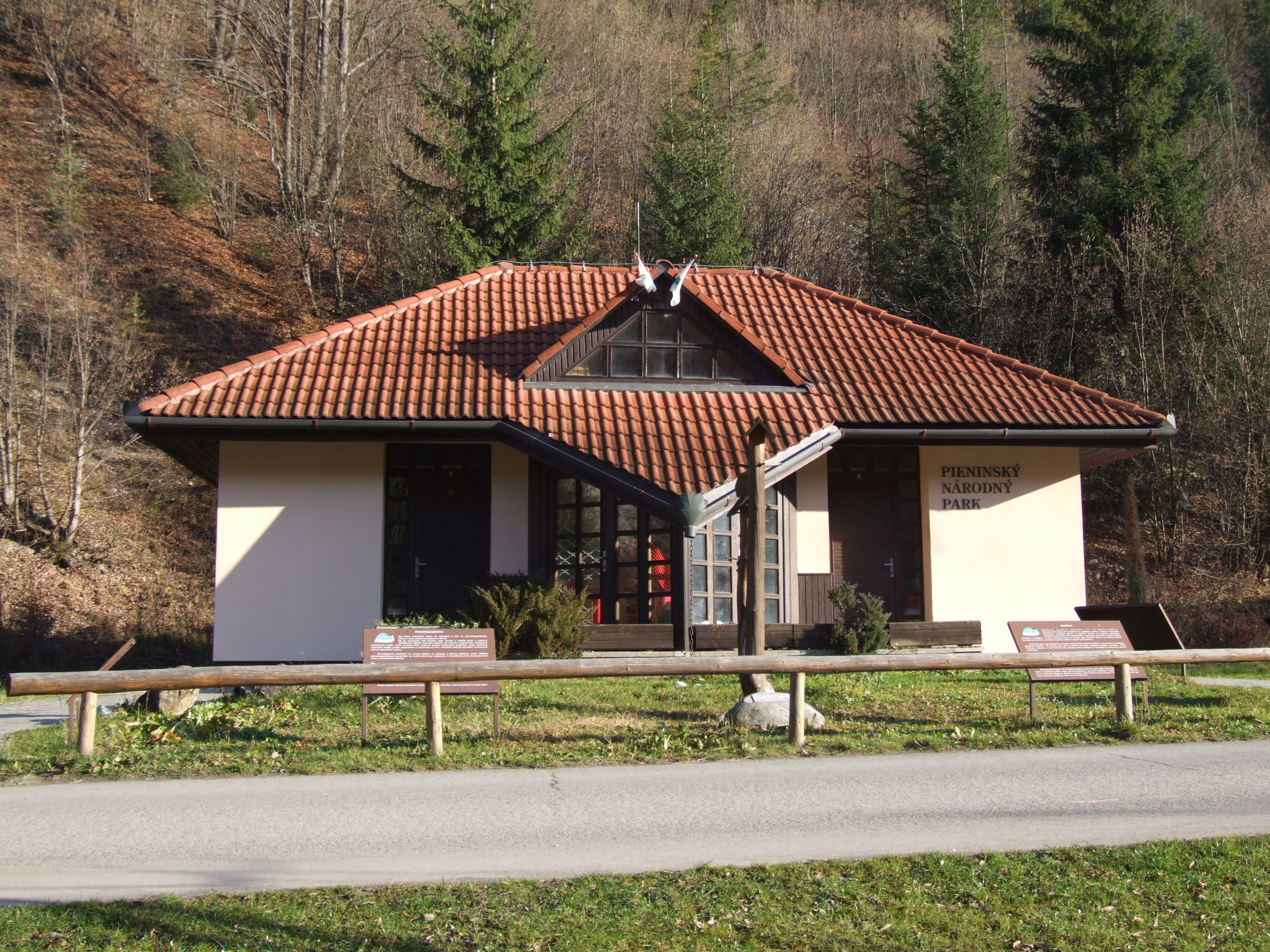
Information center of Pieniny National Park beside Chata Pieniny (mountain hostel)

== See also ==
- Pieniny National Park (Poland) - national park on the Polish side of the mountains
- Protected areas of Slovakia
