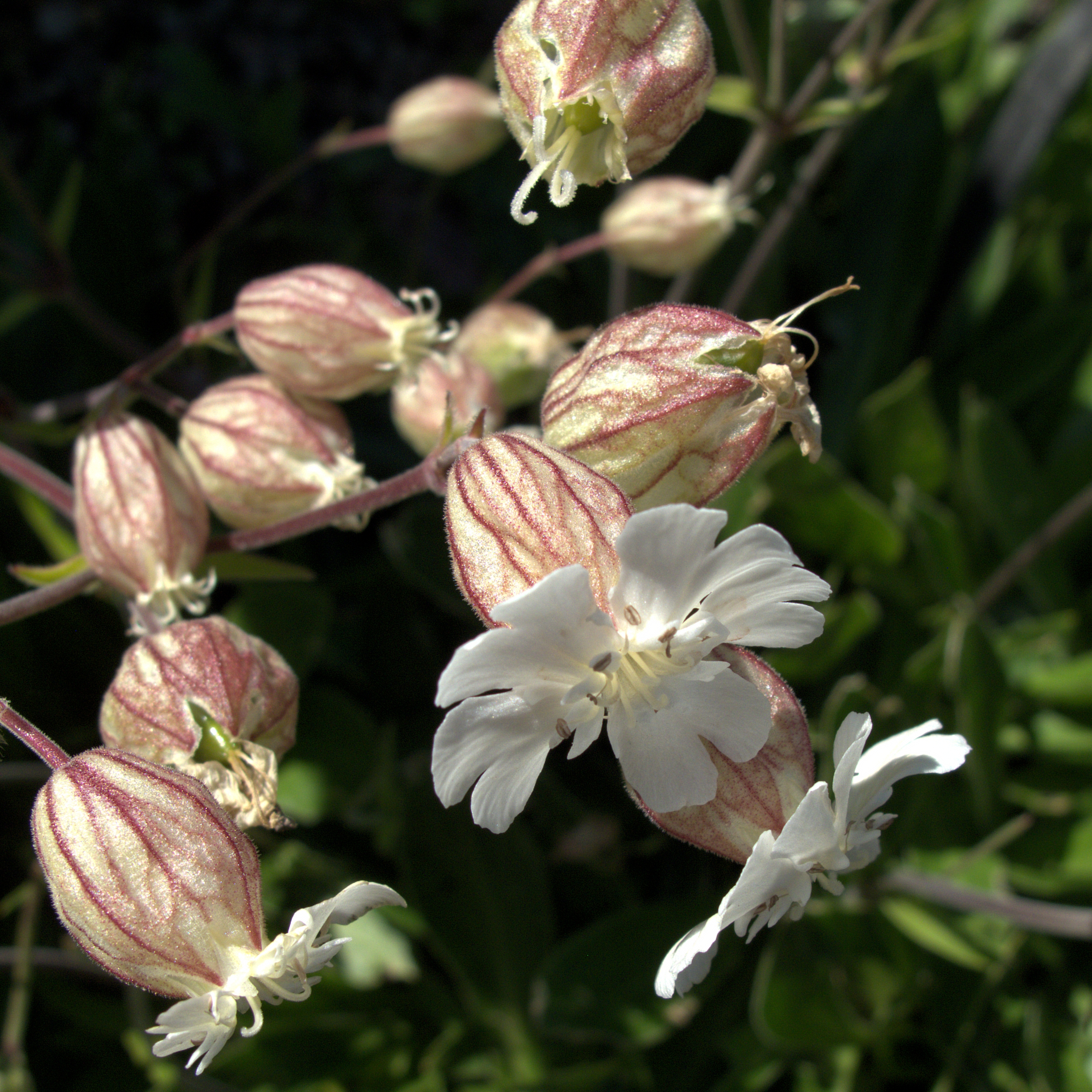

Scientific classification
- Kingdom: Plantae
- Clade: Tracheophytes
- Clade: Angiosperms
- Clade: Eudicots
- Order: Caryophyllales
- Family: Caryophyllaceae
- Genus: Silene
- Species: S. zawadzkii

Binomial name
- Silene zawadzkii Herbich

Synonyms
- Elisanthe zawadzkii (Herbich) Fuss; Silenanthe zawadzkii (Herbich) Griseb. & Schenk

= Silene zawadzkii =

Species of flowering plant

Silene zawadzkii is a species of flowering plant in the family Caryophyllaceae. The species is native to Ukraine and Romania.
