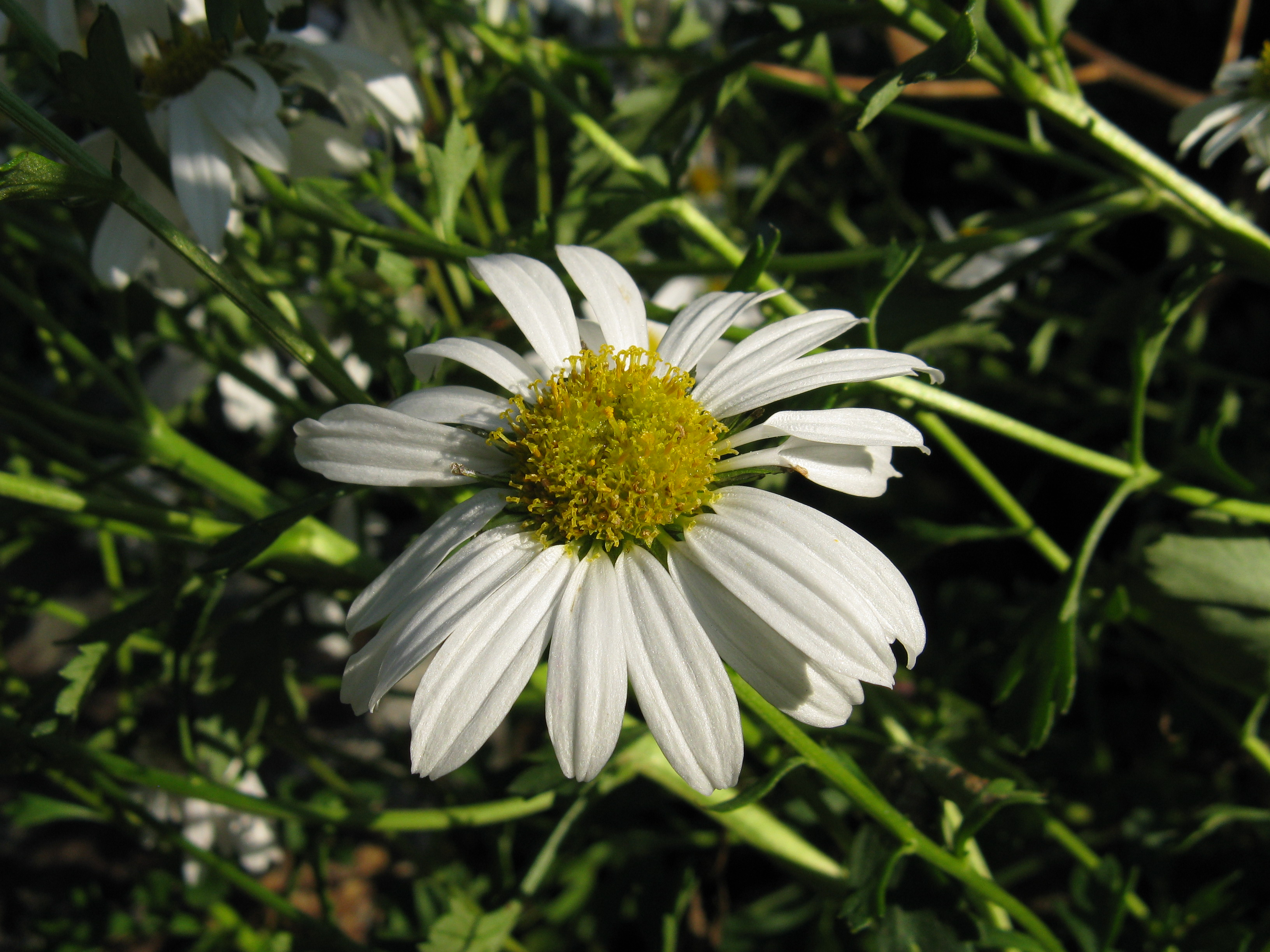

Scientific classification
- Kingdom: Plantae
- Clade: Tracheophytes
- Clade: Angiosperms
- Clade: Eudicots
- Clade: Asterids
- Order: Asterales
- Family: Asteraceae
- Genus: Chrysanthemum
- Species: C. zawadzkii

Binomial name
- Chrysanthemum zawadzkii Herbich

Synonyms
- Dendranthema zawadzkii (Herbich) Tzvelev; Leucanthemum zawadzkii (Herbich) Nyman; Pyrethrum zawadzkii (Herbich) Nyman; Tanacetum zawadzkii (Herbich) Pawł.

= Chrysanthemum zawadzkii =

Species of plant

Chrysanthemum zawadzkii is a species of short perennial herb in the family Asteraceae native to eastern Europe and to Asia. The species was described from the Pieniny mountains in 1829 by Franz Herbich and named after Aleksander Zawadzki. The species is also known to occur in Russia extending to Japan. In Europe it is found in Russia, Poland and the Ukraine. In temperate Asia it is found in Mongolia, Manchuria, Siberia, Korea and Japan

It grows from 1 ft high up to 1.5 ft high and spreads as wide as it grows high. In the northern hemisphere It flowers from July to September.

== Taxonomy ==
It was first described in 1831 by Franz Herbich, but later has been assigned to other genera by other botanists: in 1854 by Carl Fredrik Nyman to the genus, Pyrethrum, in 1879 again by Nyman to the genus, Leucanthemum, in 1934 by Bogumił Pawłowski to the genus Tanacetum, and in 1961 by Nikolai Tzvelev to the genus Dendranthema.

== Gallery ==
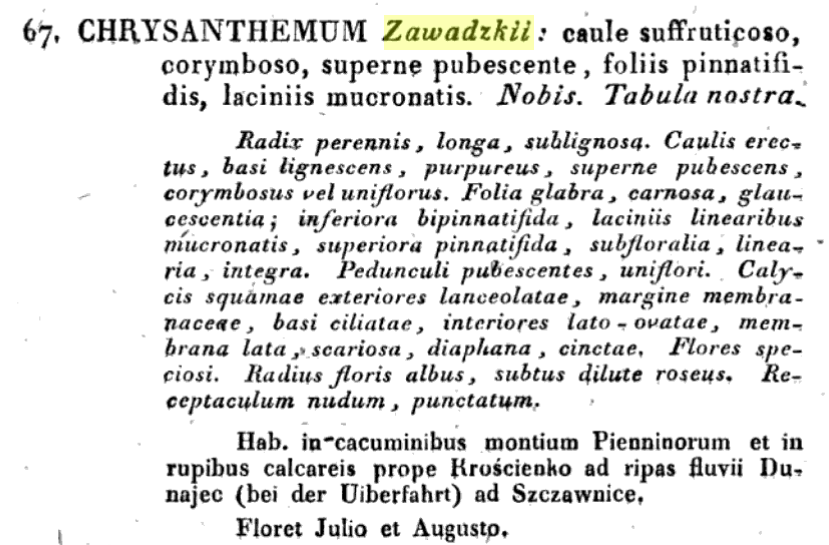
Protologue - 1831

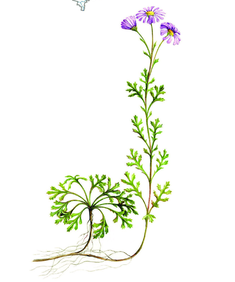
image from Komi Scientific Centre
