= Stanisław Pietruski =

Polish zoologist and horticulturist (1811 – 1874)

Stanisław Konstanty Pietruski (11 March 1811 – 28 January 1874) was a Polish zoologist and horticulturist who studied the fauna of the Carpathian region and founded the first private zoological garden in his estate in Podhorodce (Skolew region) in 1833.

== Life and work ==
Pietruski was born in Podhorodce in a family of nobility, his father Kazimierz was from the Starykoń family while his mother Karolina Chojecka was from the Lubicz family. He studied natural sciences at the University of Lviv from 1828, studying under Aleksander Zawadzki. He then went to study in Germany and returned to his estate where he studied animal behaviour. In 1833, he began a zoo containing about 500 species, mainly from Poland but also from further off. It was considered one of the largest private zoos of the time. A fire in 1848 destroyed his zoo after which he spent time in horticulture in his estate. He also took an interest in the fishes and insects of the Galician region. He corresponded widely with other zoologists in Europe including Alfred Brehm, Lorenz Oken, Rudolf Kner and Maksymilian Nowicki. He lived towards the end of his life at his sister's estate in Podhajecki.
