= Giovanni Alessandro Brambilla =

Italian physician (1728–1800)

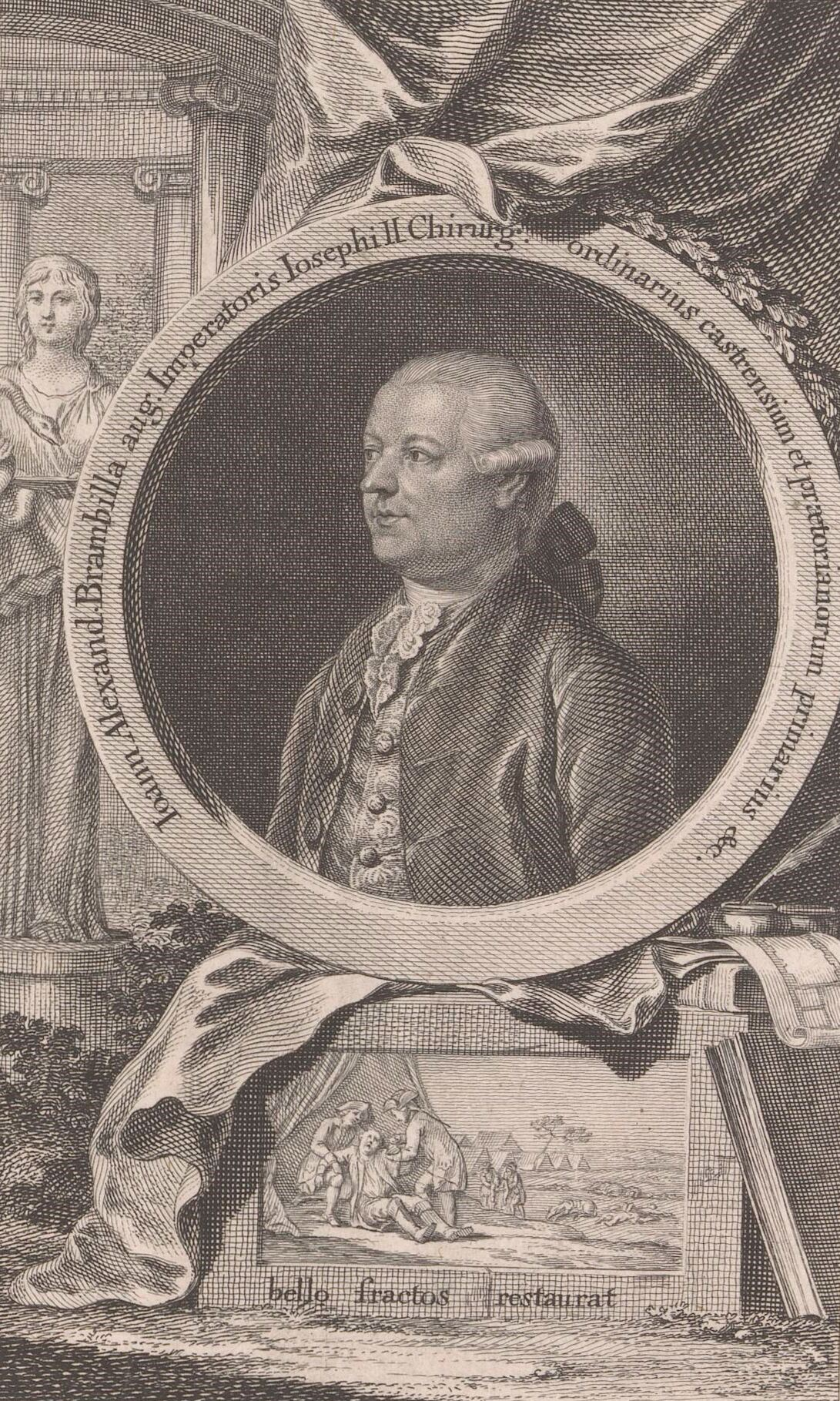
- Giovanni Alessandro Brambilla
- Born: March 15, 1728; San Zenone al Po, Duchy of Milan
- Died: July 30, 1800 (aged 72); Padua, Habsburg monarchy
- Years active: Physician

Academic background
- Education: University of Pavia
- Doctoral advisor: Girolamo Grazioli; Baldassarre Beretta

Academic work
- Discipline: Medicine; Surgery
- Institutions: Josephinian Military Academy of Surgery

Giovanni Alessandro Brambilla, Baron of Carpiano (15 April 1728 – 30 July 1800 in Padua) was a personal physician of Holy Roman Emperor Joseph II and the first director of the Josephinian Military Academy of Surgery in Vienna.

== Biography ==
Brambilla was born in San Zenone al Po near Pavia, and studied at the University of Pavia. After five years of internship at San Matteo Hospital, he joined in the Austrian army as assistant surgeon. He rose in the ranks, and by 1779, was sole supervisor of the Austrian military health system, Imperial Protosurgeon under Joseph II, Knight of the Holy Roman Empire, Aulic Counsel. His service to the emperor granted him a feudal title as lord of Carpiano.

In 1785, he founded the Medical-Surgical Academy of Vienna (better known as the Josephinium). He helped recruit Antonio Scarpa to the chair of Anatomy at the University of Pavia. After the death of Joseph II, Brambilla returned to Pavia in 1795 and lived the rest of his life there. After the Napoleonic victory of Marengo, Brambilla was travelling back to Vienna when he died.

== Bibliography ==
- Castiglioni, Arturo (1929). "Giovanni Alessandro Brambilla e altri medici italiani alla scuola di Vienna". Rassegna clinico-scientifica dell'Istituto biochimico italiano. VII (3): 119–124.
- Casarini, Arturo (1930). "Giovanni Alessandro Brambilla (1728-1800)". Profili di chirurghi militari. Rome: Istituto Poligrafico dello Stato. pp. 1–5.
