= Kurt Polycarp Joachim Sprengel =

German botanist and physician (1766–1833)

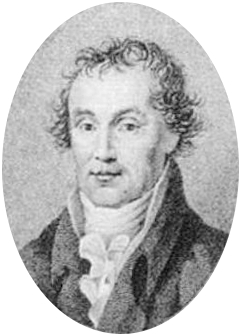
- Born: 3 August 1766; Boldekow, Pomerania (now Germany)
- Died: 15 March 1833 (aged 66); Halle (Saale), Saxony-Anhalt
- Education: University of Halle
- Relatives: Christian Konrad Sprengel (uncle)
- Scientific career
- Fields: Botanist, physician
- Institutions: University of Halle
- Author abbrev. (botany): Spreng.

Kurt Polycarp Joachim Sprengel (3 August 1766 – 15 March 1833) was a German botanist and medical doctor who published an influential multivolume history of medicine, Versuch einer pragmatischen Geschichte der Arzneikunde (1792–99 in four volumes with later editions running to five) and several other medical reference works.

== Biography ==
Sprengel was born at Boldekow in Pomerania, and he is considered of German nationality.

His father, a clergyman, provided him with a thorough education of wide scope; as boy he distinguished himself as a linguist, in Latin and Greek, and also Arabic; his uncle, Christian Konrad Sprengel (1750–1816), is remembered for his studies in the fertilization of flowers by insects – a subject in which he reached conclusions many years ahead of his time. Spreng. appeared as an author at the age of fourteen, publishing a small work called Anleitung zur Botanik für Frauenzimmer ("guide to botany for women") in 1780.

In 1784, he began to study theology and medicine at the university of Halle, but soon relinquished the former. He graduated in medicine in 1787. In 1789, he was appointed extraordinary professor of medicine in his alma mater, and in 1795 was promoted to be ordinary professor. He devoted much of his time to medical work and to investigations into the history of medicine; and he held a foremost rank as an original investigator both in medicine and botany. Among the more important of his many services to the latter science was the part he took in awakening and stimulating microscopic investigation into the anatomy of the tissues of the higher plants, though defective microscopic appliances rendered the conclusions arrived at by himself untrustworthy. He also made many improvements in the details of both the Linnaean and the natural systems of classification. Sprengel's multivolume history of medicine was expanded on by Burkard Eble who produced a second edition.

Sprengel became correspondent of the Royal Institute of the Netherlands in 1809, he was elected a foreign member of the Royal Swedish Academy of Sciences in 1810.

== Selected publications ==
- Curtii Sprengel Historia rei herbariae . Vol.1–2 . Taberna librariae et artium, Amsteldami 1807 – 1808 Digital edition by the University and State Library Düsseldorf
- Sprengel, Kurt Polycarp Joachim (1820–1823). Neue Entdeckungen im ganzen Umfang der Pflanzenkunde 3 vols. Leipzig: F. Fleischer.
