= Weil der Stadt =

- Town
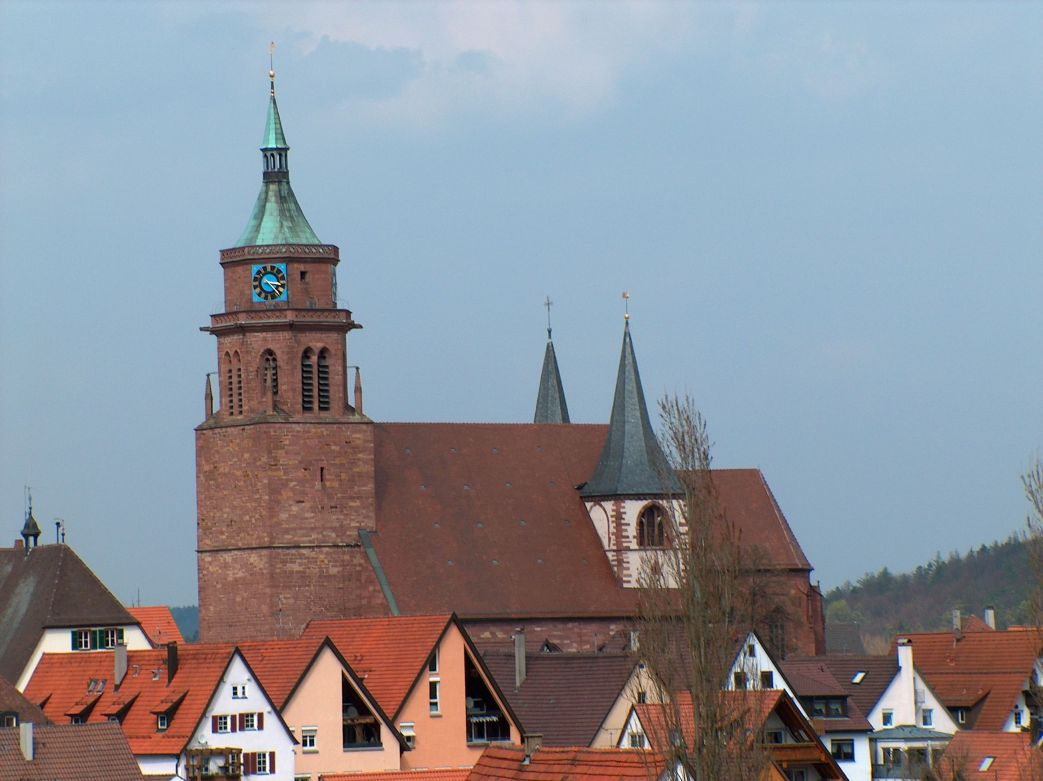
- Church of Saints Peter and Paul

- Coat of arms

- Location of Weil der Stadt within Böblingen district
- Interactive map of Weil der Stadt
- Location within Germany Location within Baden-Württemberg
- Coordinates: 48°45′3″N 8°52′14″E
- Country: Germany
- State: Baden-Württemberg
- District: Böblingen

Government
  - Mayor (2020–28): Christian Walter

Area
  - Total: 43.17 km^{2} (16.67 sq mi)
- Elevation: 406 m (1,332 ft)

Population (2025-12-31)
  - Total: 19,311
  - Density: 447.3/km^{2} (1,159/sq mi)
- Time zone: UTC+01:00 (CET)
  - Summer (DST): UTC+02:00 (CEST)
- Postal codes: 71255–71263
- Dialling codes: 07033
- Vehicle registration: BB
- Website: www.weil-der-stadt.de

Weil der Stadt (German pronunciation: [ˈvaɪl deːɐ̯ ˈʃtat]) is a town of about 19,000 inhabitants in the Stuttgart Region of the German state of Baden-Württemberg. It is about 30 km (19 mi) west of Stuttgart city centre, in the valley of the River Würm, and is often called the "Gate to the Black Forest".

== Name ==
The name Weil derives from the Latin word villa, an estate or manor. The suffix die Stadt (the town) was added to distinguish Weil from various nearby villages of the same name, such as Weil im Dorf and Weil im Schönbuch. The modern name is unusual in that it contains the dative article der rather than the nominative article die. This quirk arose because place names typically come after prepositions that govern the dative case in German, such as in or aus. The Roman origins of the town are immortalized in its coat of arms, which features the motto SPQR.

== History ==
The village of Wile was first mentioned in 1075, and described as the property of the famous abbey of Hirsau. Weil der Stadt became a Free Imperial City in 1272, but had existed for centuries before as an important trading place. In 1294 Augustinian monks would become established in the town.

The city was completely destroyed during the Thirty Years' War in 1648 but was subsequently rebuilt, and is still dominated by buildings from this period. The city's fortifications have survived largely intact, with city walls, gates, and several towers.

Weil der Stadt is best known as the birthplace of the astronomer Johannes Kepler (1571–1630), and it bears the unofficial title of Keplerstadt, or Kepler town. Another famous son is the Protestant reformer Johannes Brenz (1499–1570). Due to its surroundings and attractive cityscape, dominated by the church steeple of St. Peter and Paul, Weil der Stadt is a popular destination for excursions in the Stuttgart region.

== Events ==
Weil der Stadt is a stronghold of traditional carnival, which is celebrated with a parade in the city centre. In contrast to the carnival in the Rhineland, the carnival in Weil der Stadt, called Fasnet, is based on Alemannic traditions, shared by various towns in southwestern Germany and Switzerland.

Weil der Stadt escaped destruction in World War II when a French artillery barrage was called off in honour of it being Kepler's birthplace.

== Notable people ==
- Heinrich Steinhöwel (ca. 1410 - 1479), German doctor, humanist, translator and writer.
- Paul Scriptoris (ca. 1460 – 1505), a German Franciscan mathematician and Scotist
- Johannes Brenz (1499–1570), Lutheran theologian and the Protestant Reformer.
- Johannes Kepler (1571–1630), astronomer, mathematician, astrologer, natural philosopher and writer on music.
- Joseph Anton Gall (1748–1807), the Bishop of Linz from 1788 to 1807.
- Adolph Schoeninger (1833–1900), American businessman in Philadelphia, Pennsylvania; owned Western Wheel Works which manufactured bicycles
