= Franz Herbich =

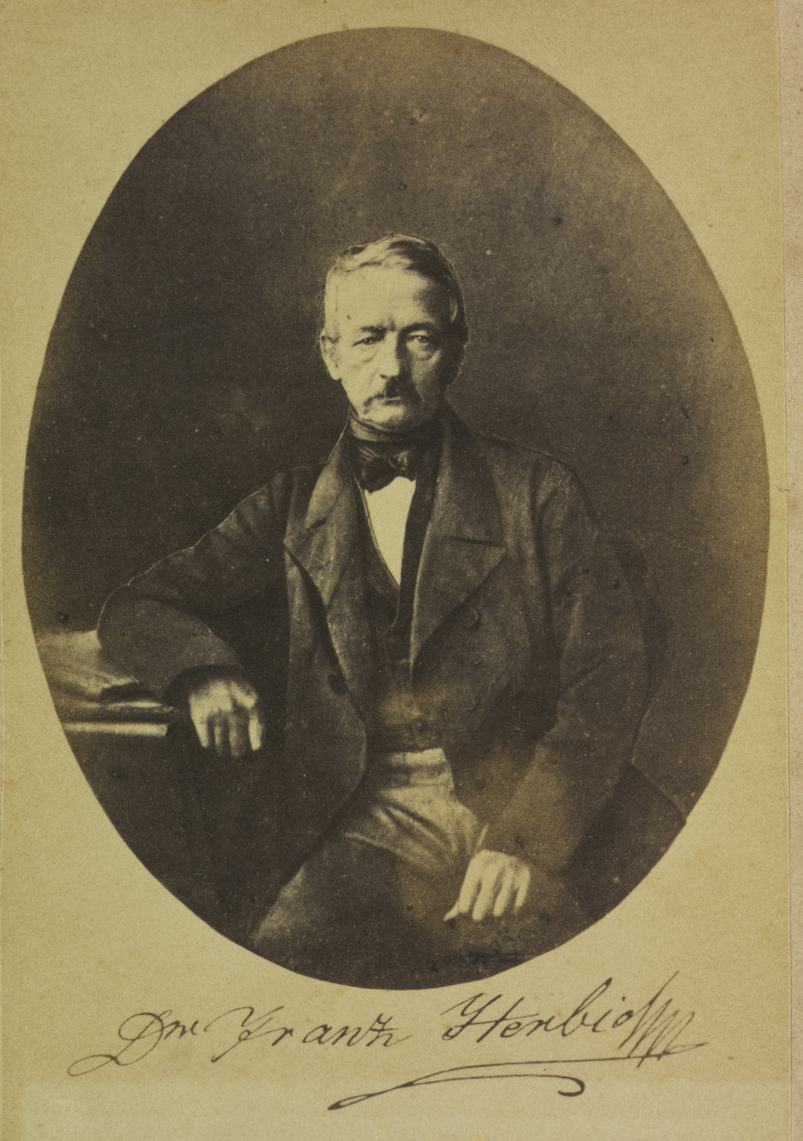

Franz Herbich or Franciszek Herbich (May 8, 1791 – September 9, 1865) was an Austrian botanist. He examined the flora of Galicia extensively. His namesake son Franciszek Herbich (1821-1887) was a geologist.

== Biography ==
Herbich was born in Vienna where his father was a surgeon at a hospital who managed a large home garden with the help of a gardener who worked for Baron Von der Lühe. Herbich learned the names of numerous plants at an early age. After completing his Gymnasium studies in 1809 he joined military service. In 1810 he became a student of Johann Nepomuk Isfordink and in 1813 he joined the Josephinum Academy. In 1814 he became a senior physician although he received a doctorate only in 1816. Around the same time he met Franz Winkler of the Tiger Apotheke who was a keen botanist and the two became close friends, going on expeditions together, often climbing into the mountains including Raxalpe and Schneeberg. Around 1815 he was posted into the field during the hostilities with France and he travelled through the Alps. In 1832 he moved to Baron Strauch's infantry regiment at Stanisławów and the next year was spent in Czerniowce. Here he spent 22 years, returning to Krakow in 1856 and staying on there until his death.

He collected numerous plant specimens from across the Carpathian region describing at least 23 new species. He was also involved in founding the Galician Physiographical Society. His publications include Additamenta ad floram Galiciae (1831), Stirpes rariores Bucovinae, oder die seltenen Pflanzen der Bucovina (1853), Flora der Bucovina (1859), Ueber die Verbreitung der in Galizien und der Bukovina wildwachsenden Pflanzen (1861), and Przyczynek do geografii roślin w Galicyi (1866). He is buried in the Rakowicki Cemetery in Kraków.

The standard author abbreviation Herbich is used to indicate this person as the author when citing a botanical name.
