= Adolph Schoeninger =

German-born American industrialist (1833–1900)

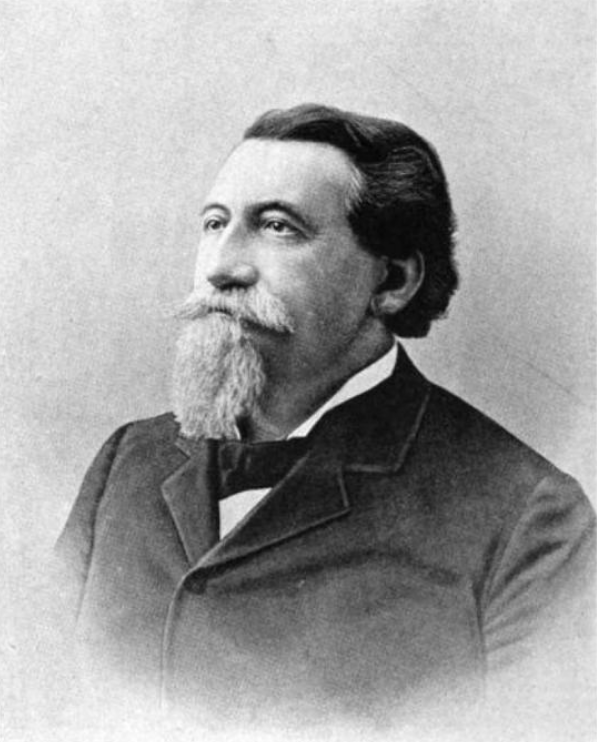
- Schoeninger in 1897
- Born: January 20, 1833; Weil der Stadt, Germany
- Died: December 13, 1900 (aged 67); Los Angeles, California, US
- Burial place: Graceland Cemetery
- Citizenship: United States
- Occupation: Industrialist
- Years active: 1866–1893
- Known for: Owning Western Wheel Works
- Spouse: Augusta Reichmann (m. 1857)
- Children: 3

Signature
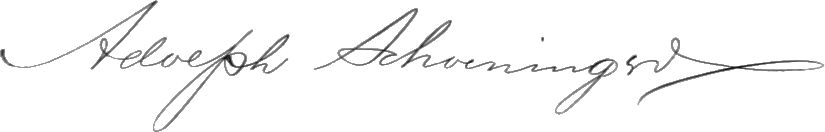

Adolph Schoeninger (January 20, 1833 – December 13, 1900) was a German-born American businessman. He was born in Weil der Stadt, Germany, and moved to Philadelphia, Pennsylvania. He was an industrialist who owned Western Wheel Works in Chicago, Illinois. His company became one of the largest bicycle manufacturers in the world.

== Early life ==
Schoeninger's parents were Joseph A. and Anna M. (née Eble) Schoeninger. Schoeninger was educated in Germany and moved to the United States with his brother in 1854. He lived in Philadelphia, Pennsylvania.

== Military service ==
When the American Civil War began, Schoeninger was offered a command of a company in the 75th Pennsylvania Infantry Regiment. He served as a Captain under (then) colonel Henry Bohlen from 1861 to 1864.

In 1864 Schoeninger returned to Philadelphia after the war, destitute.

== Career ==
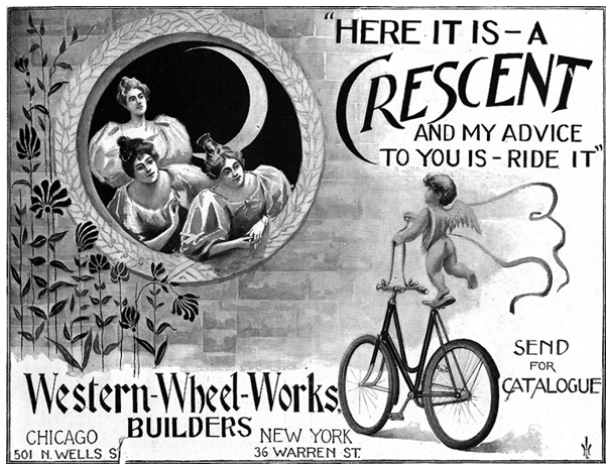
Baby angel - 1898 advertisement

In 1865 Schoeninger moved to Chicago and opened a furniture business. But in 1866 he was left with a great financial loss when the factory burned down. In 1866 he then took over another factory that produced toys and baby carriages and named it Western Wheel Works, in partnership with a man named F. Westermann; they started out manufacturing toys and other novelties as the Western Toy Company.

Schoeninger ran the company until the Great Chicago Fire of 1871 destroyed his business. He did not have the proper insurance on his buildings, and was again left with a great financial loss. By 1872 he obtained financing from European banks and rebuilt the factories.

By the mid-1890s, bicycles were very popular, and his company began building bicycles, renamed Western Wheel Works. By 1899 it employed 1,500 people and produced 350 bicycles a day.

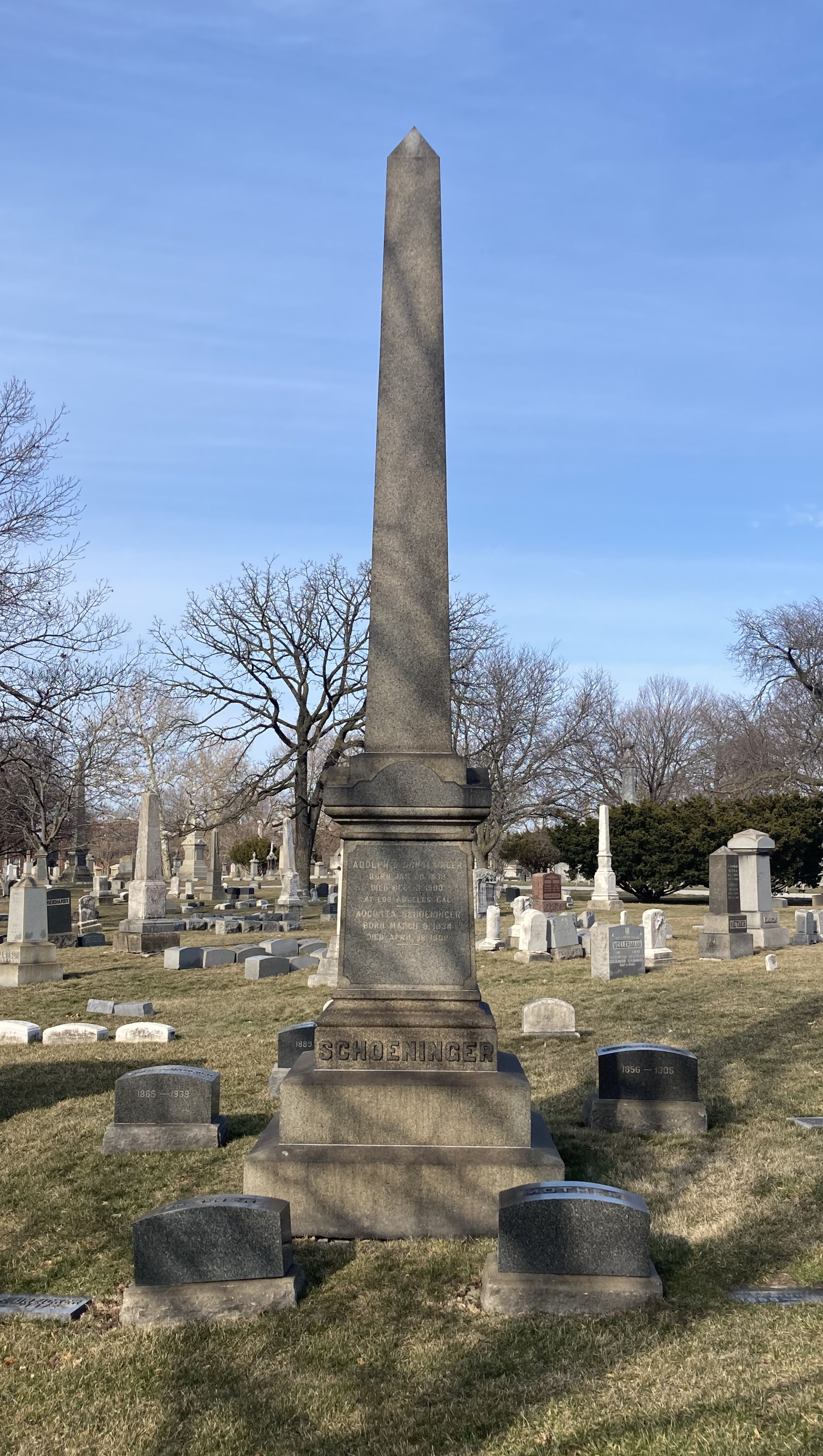
Schoeninger's grave at Graceland Cemetery

In 1893 Schoeninger transferred his ownership of the Western Wheel Works to his two sons-in-law. He returned to making toys and baby carriages, starting a new company which he called the Home Rattan Company.

== Personal life ==
Schoeninger married Augusta Reichmann on April 20, 1857. They had three children, one boy and two girls. His only son died and left him without an heir.

Mayor Harvey Doolittle Colvin appointed Schoeninger to serve a three-year term on the Chicago Board of Education. He served on the committee on reception when the 1892 Democratic National Convention was held in Chicago.

== Death ==
Schoeninger spent winters in Los Angeles, California. On December 13, 1900, he died of a lung ailment in Los Angeles. He was buried at Graceland Cemetery in Chicago.
