= Johann Nepomuk Isfordink =

Austrian army physician (1776–1841)

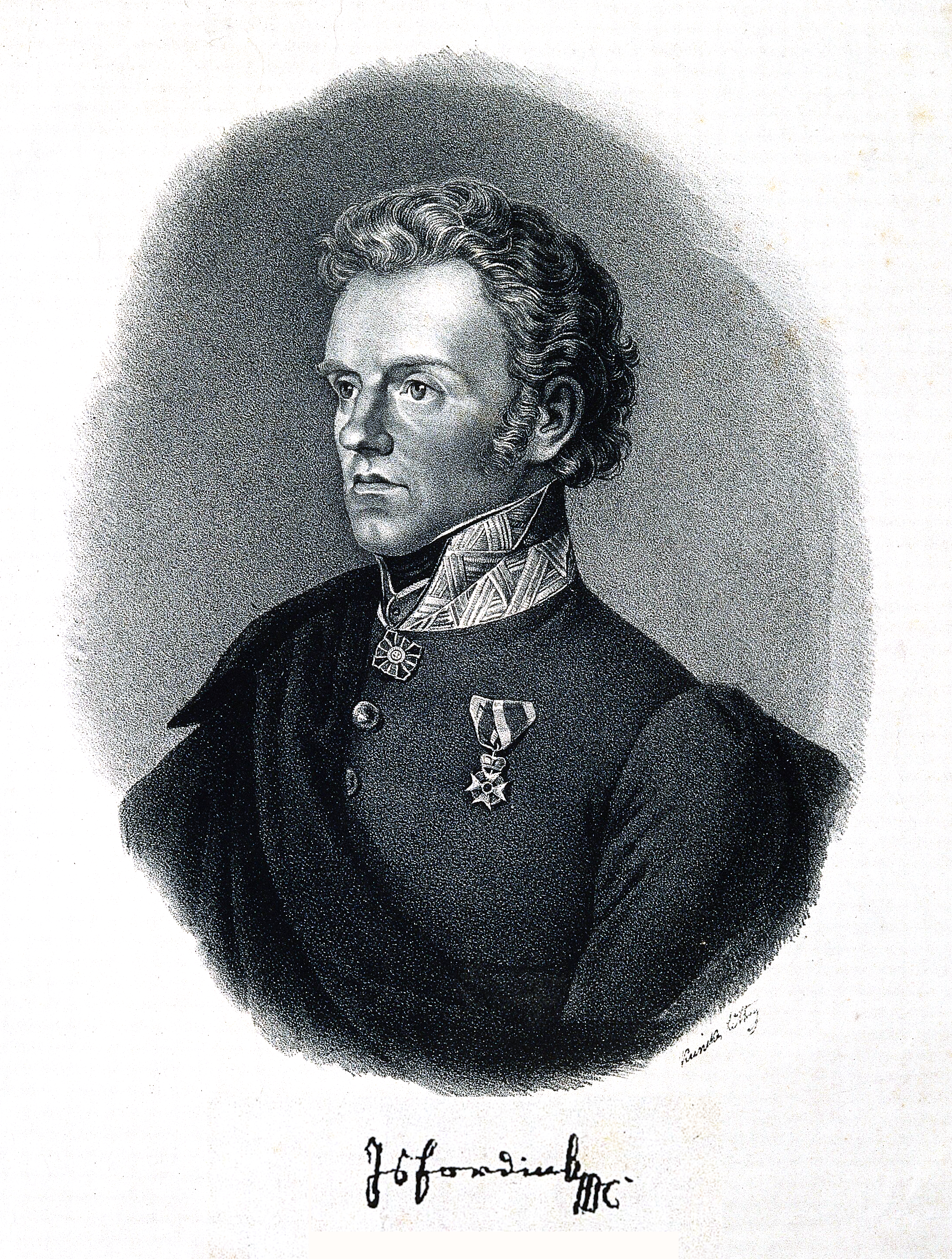
Lithograph by Adolph F. Kunike

Johann Nepomuk Isfordink and from 1835 Isfordink Edler von Kostnitz (1776 – 5 June 1841) was an Austrian army physician. He was involved in raising the Josephinian Military Academy of Surgery in Vienna to the status of a university and wrote several books.

Isfordink was born in Konstanz, son of district administrator Ludwig J. zu Bregenz. Educated at the University of Freiburg, he joined the Tyrolean Imperial Jaeger Regiment as a physician in 1802. He promoted vaccination in Tyrol, privately publishing popular pamphlets. He became a doctorate at the Josephinum in 1806 and rose to the position of regimental doctor in 1809. In 1822 he became chief field doctor and director of the Josephinum. Isfordink helped elevate the Josephinum to a full university by influencing Emperor Francis II but this college was merged back to the university in 1849. He also founded a natural history museum in the Josephinum and participated in scholarly societies such as the Society for Natural Science and Medicine in Dresden, the Imperial Russian Medical-Surgical Academy in Petersburg and the Society for Natural Science and Medicine in Heidelberg. He was given a noble title by the Austrian Emperor on 19 September 1835 as Edler von Kostnitz.
