= Christian Joseph Berres =

Austrian anatomist

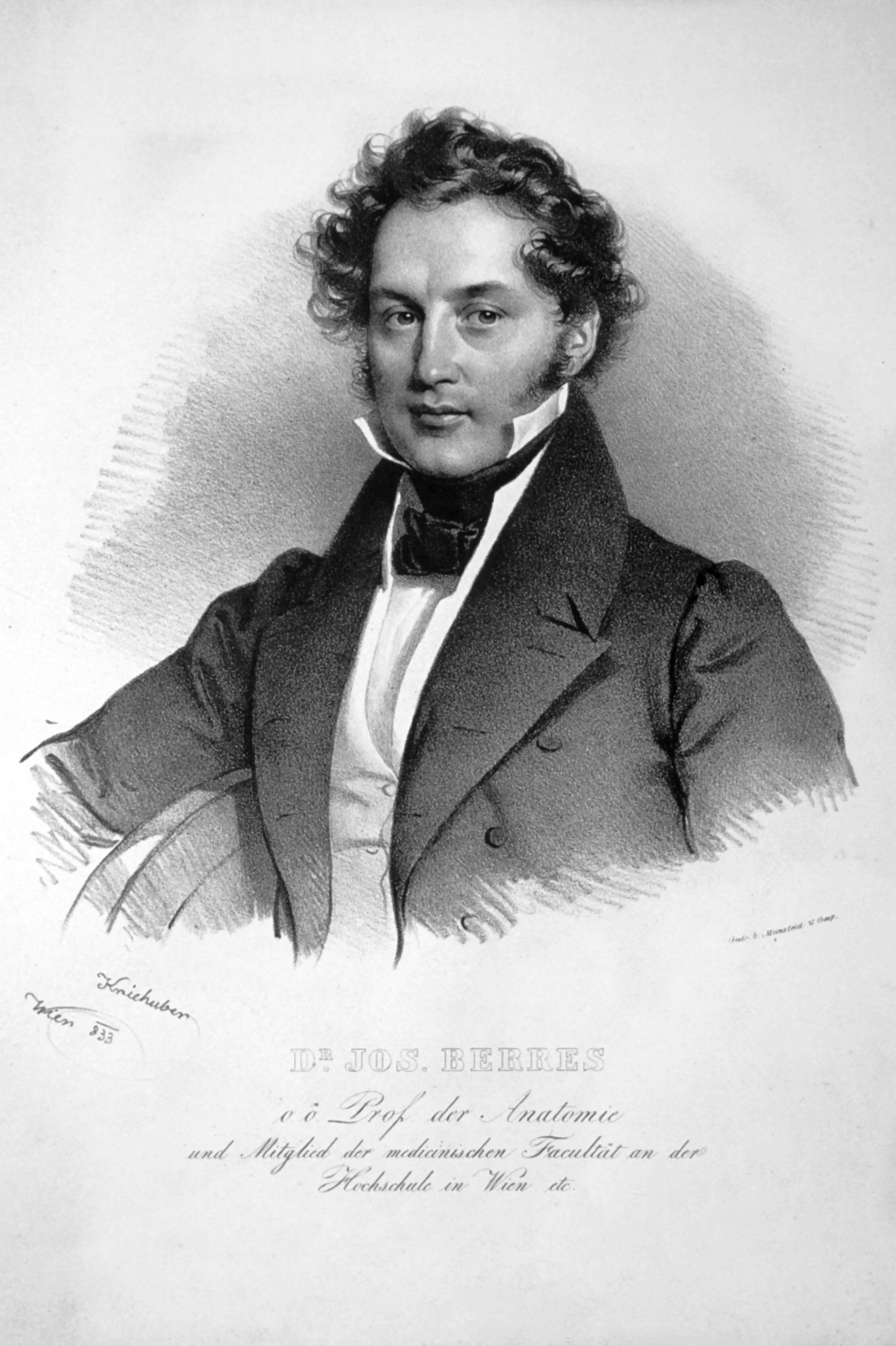
1833 lithograph of Berres by Josef Kriehuber.

Christian Joseph Berres Edler von Perez (18 March 1796, Göding – 24 December 1844, Vienna) was an Austrian anatomist.

He studied surgery in Vienna, and soon afterwards served as a professor of anatomy at Lemberg. In 1831 he was appointed professor of anatomy at the University of Vienna.

Known for his work in microscopic anatomy, Berres was a pioneer of photomicrography, reportedly producing photomicrographs via the daguerreotype method as early as 1839.

== Publications ==
- Praktische Erfahrungen über die Natur der Cholera in Lemberg und Behandlungsart derselben, 1831 - Practical experience on the nature of cholera in Lviv and its associated treatment.
- Anthropotomie; oder, Lehre von dem Baue des menschlichen Körpers, 1835-41 - Anthropotomy, instruction on the build of the human body.
- Anatomie der mikroskopischen Gebilde des menschlichen Körpers : Anatomia partium microscopica rum corporis humani, 1836-42 - The anatomy of microscopic structures in humans.
- "Anatomia microscopica corporis humani", 1837.
