= Western Wheel Works =

Bicycle manufacturer

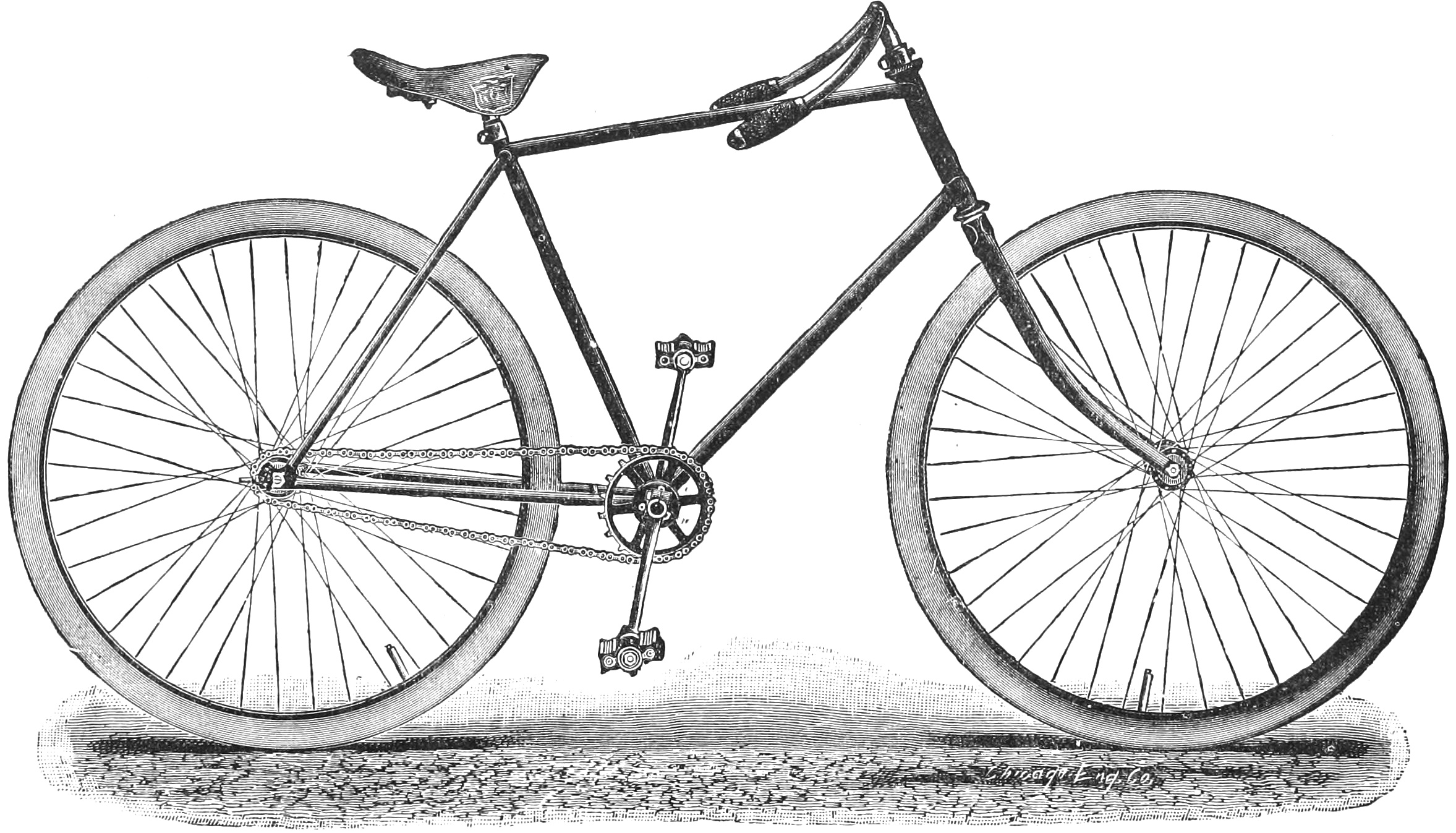
- Western Wheel Works bicycle, 1892
- Industry: Manufacturing
- Founded: 1866; 159 years ago in Chicago, U.S.
- Founder: Adolph Schoeninger
- Headquarters: Chicago
- Products: Bicycles
- Number of employees: 1500

Western Wheel Works was a Chicago bicycle company started by Adolph Schoeninger in 1866. It was one of the largest bicycle makers in the world. In 1899 it joined a trust which controlled 95 percent of the bicycle manufacturing market.

== History ==
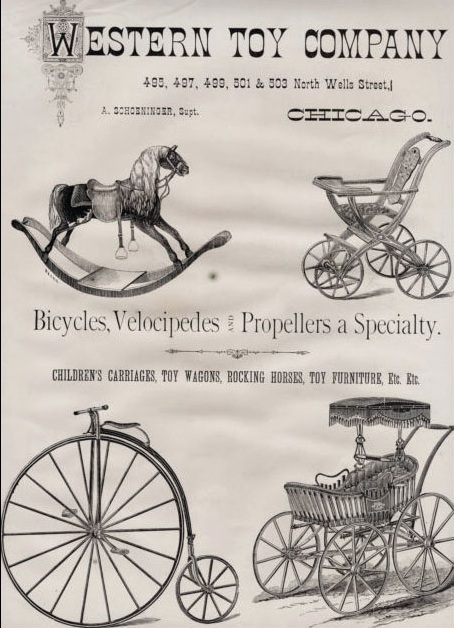
1875 WTW ad

In 1865, Schoeninger and his partner F. Westermann started out manufacturing toys and other novelties under the name Western Toy Company. The factory burned down in 1866. In 1866 Western toy Works took over another factory which produced toy and baby carriages. The Western toy Company specialized in toy wagons.

The toy company operated until the Great Chicago Fire of 1871. By 1872 Schoeninger obtained financing from European banks and rebuilt. In 1887 The Western Toy Company purchased the Vergho Rubling Co., a former toy dealer.

The company began making safety bicycles bicycles in the late 1880s, under the Crescent name. It also manufactured tricycles and children's bikes in 1890. By 1890 it was among the largest bicycle manufacturers in the world. It is known as a pioneer in the mass production of bicycles: rather than machining bicycle "parts such as hubs, sprockets, chain guards, fenders, and rims", it employed the much faster process of stamping them, thereby more than doubling the output of the factory in 1891.

In 1893 Schoeninger transferred his ownership of the company to his two sons-in-law and he started a new company called the Home Rattan Company.

By 1897 the company employed 1,500 people and produced 350 bicycles a day.

=== American Bicycle Company (1899-1903) ===
In 1899 the company joined a trust which was set up to control the bicycle market in the United States. Forty-two factories were part of the trust; the major barrier to organizing it was the manufacturer of rubber tires. It was decided that tires would be purchased from the "Rubber King", Charles R. Flint. The trust which formed under the name American Bicycle Company only lasted a few years. Historians have not determined why the company failed but they have several theories. One idea was that the company was poorly organized, and another theory is that the various manufacturers involved in the company had different objectives. After the breakup the many different companies went back to competing.

== Gallery ==
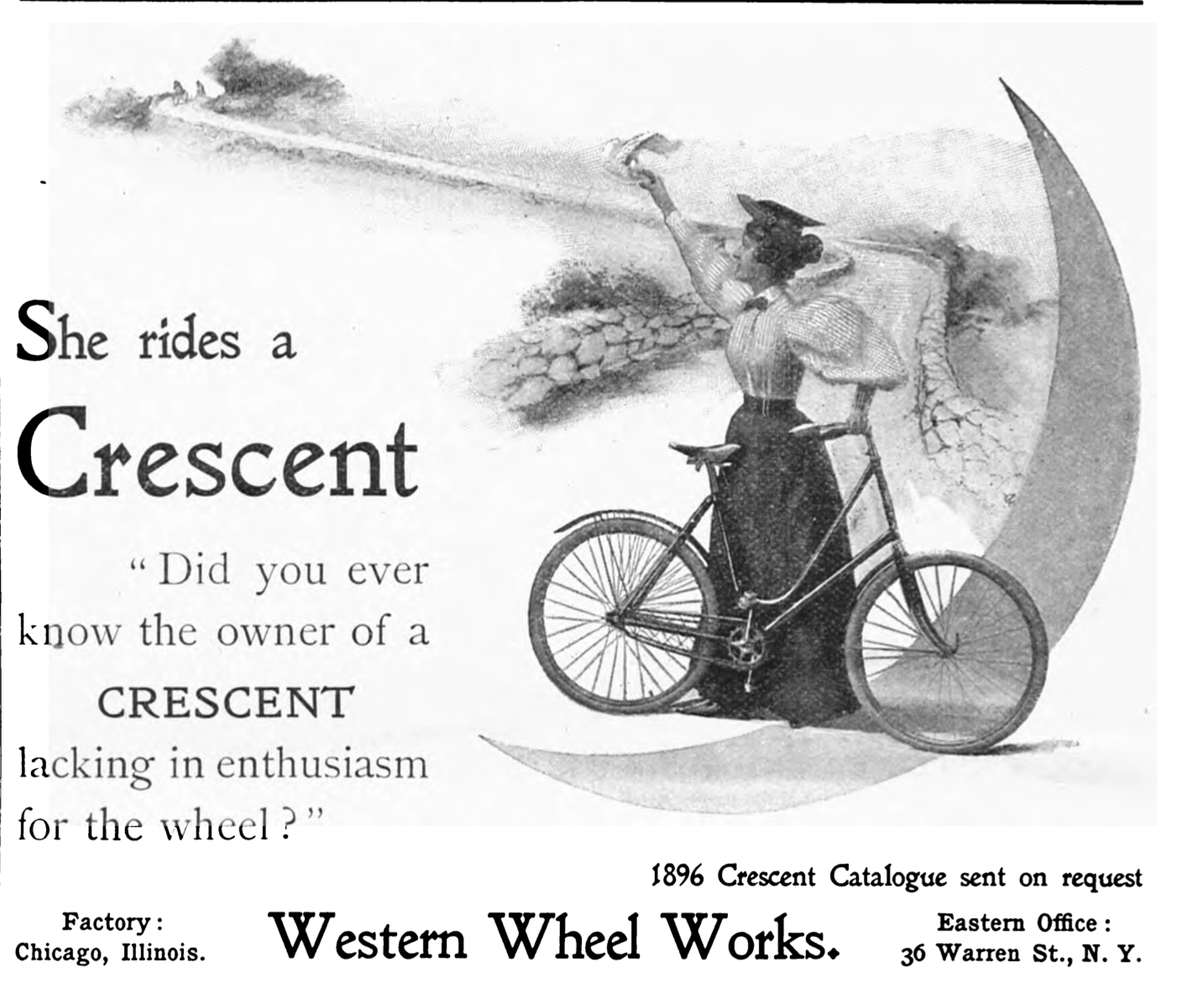
Crescent bicycle advertisement, July 1896

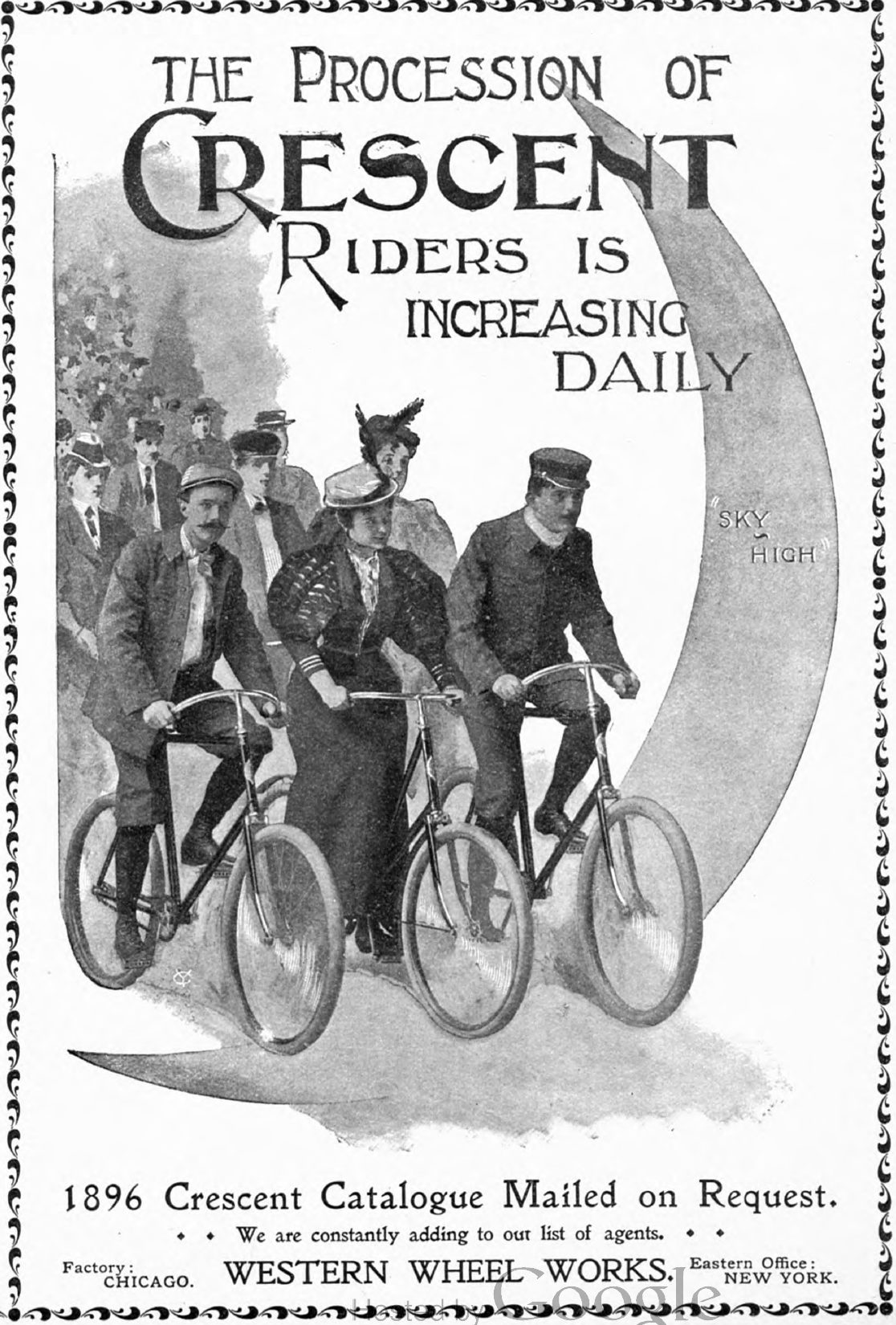
"The Procession of Crescent riders is increasing daily"

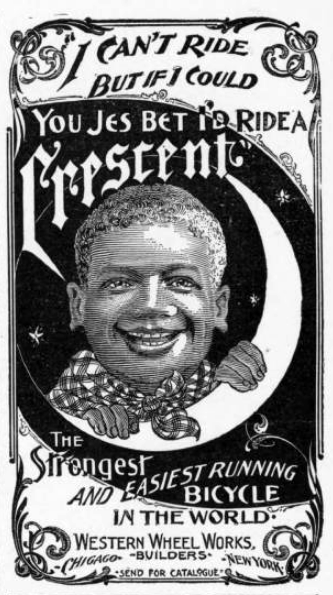
1896 baby ad

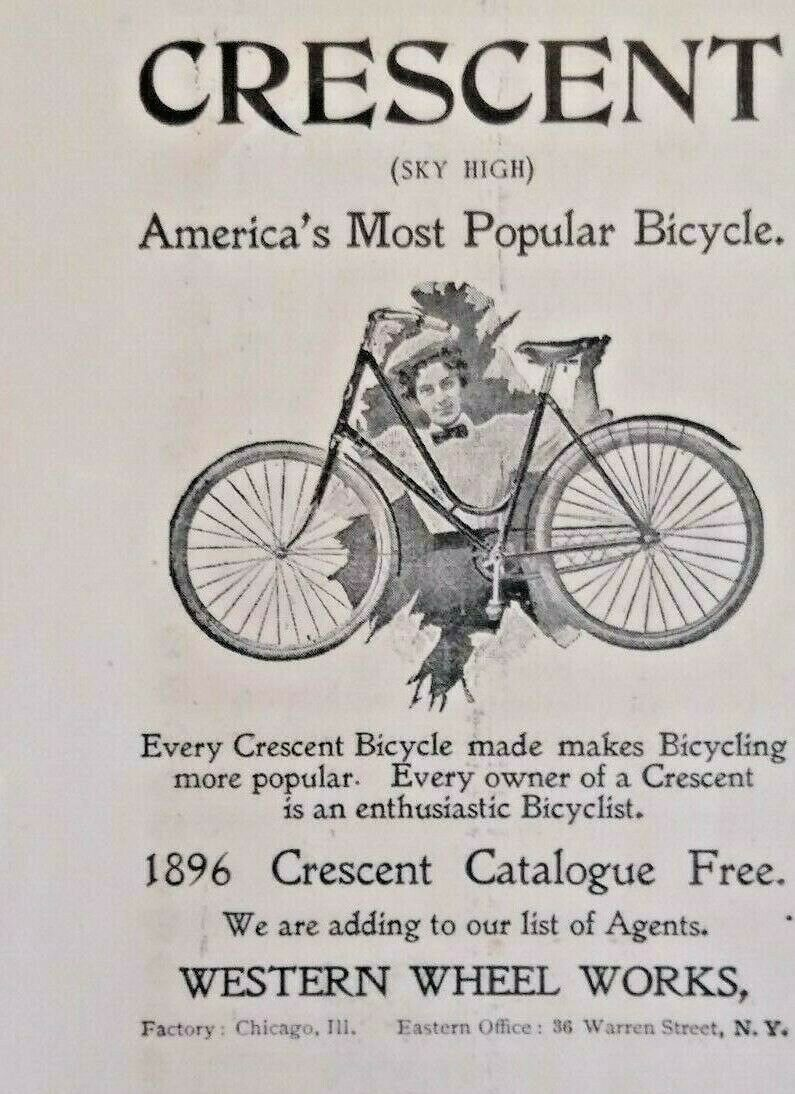
1896 marketing to women

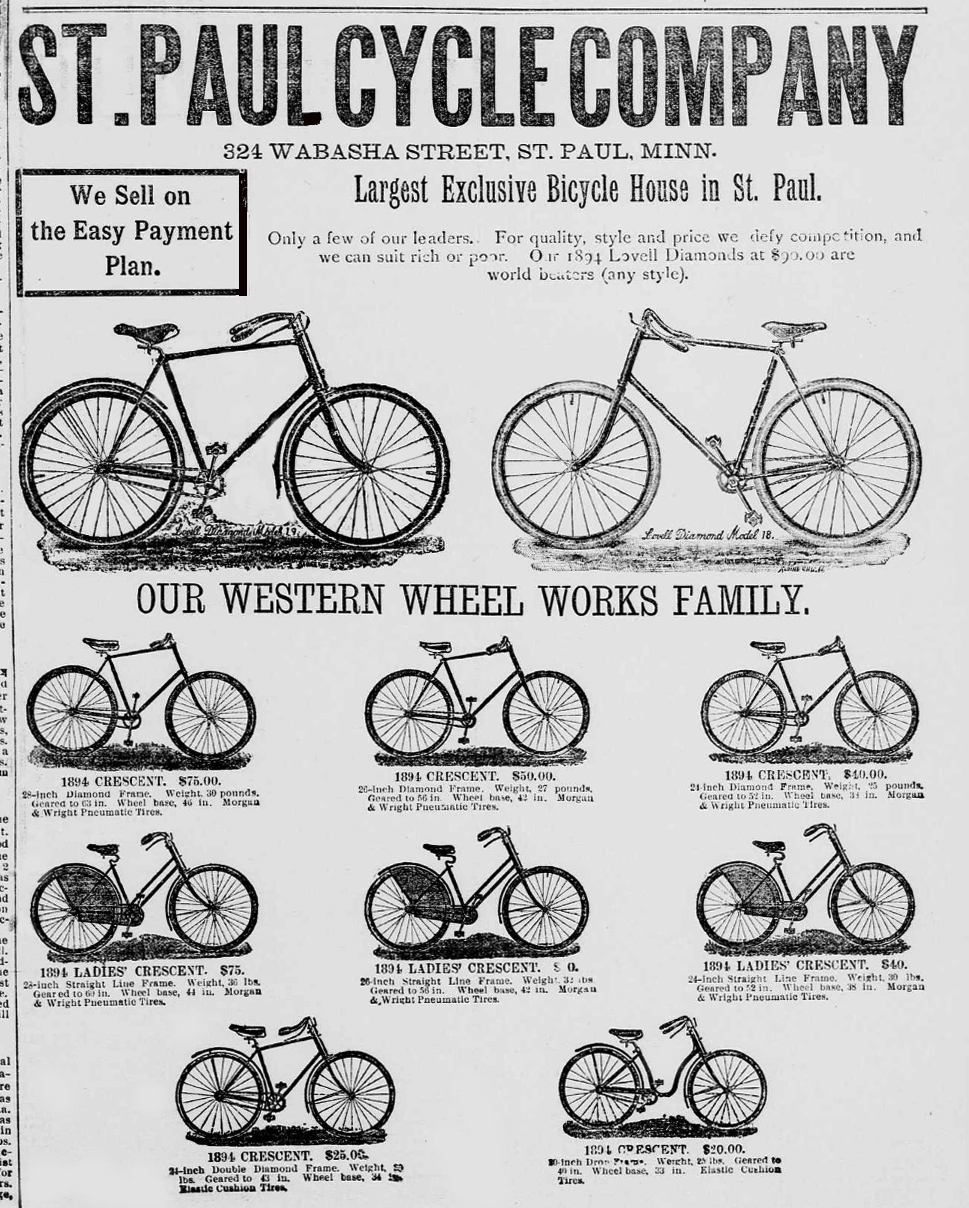
Advertisement for 1894 model Crescent bicycles

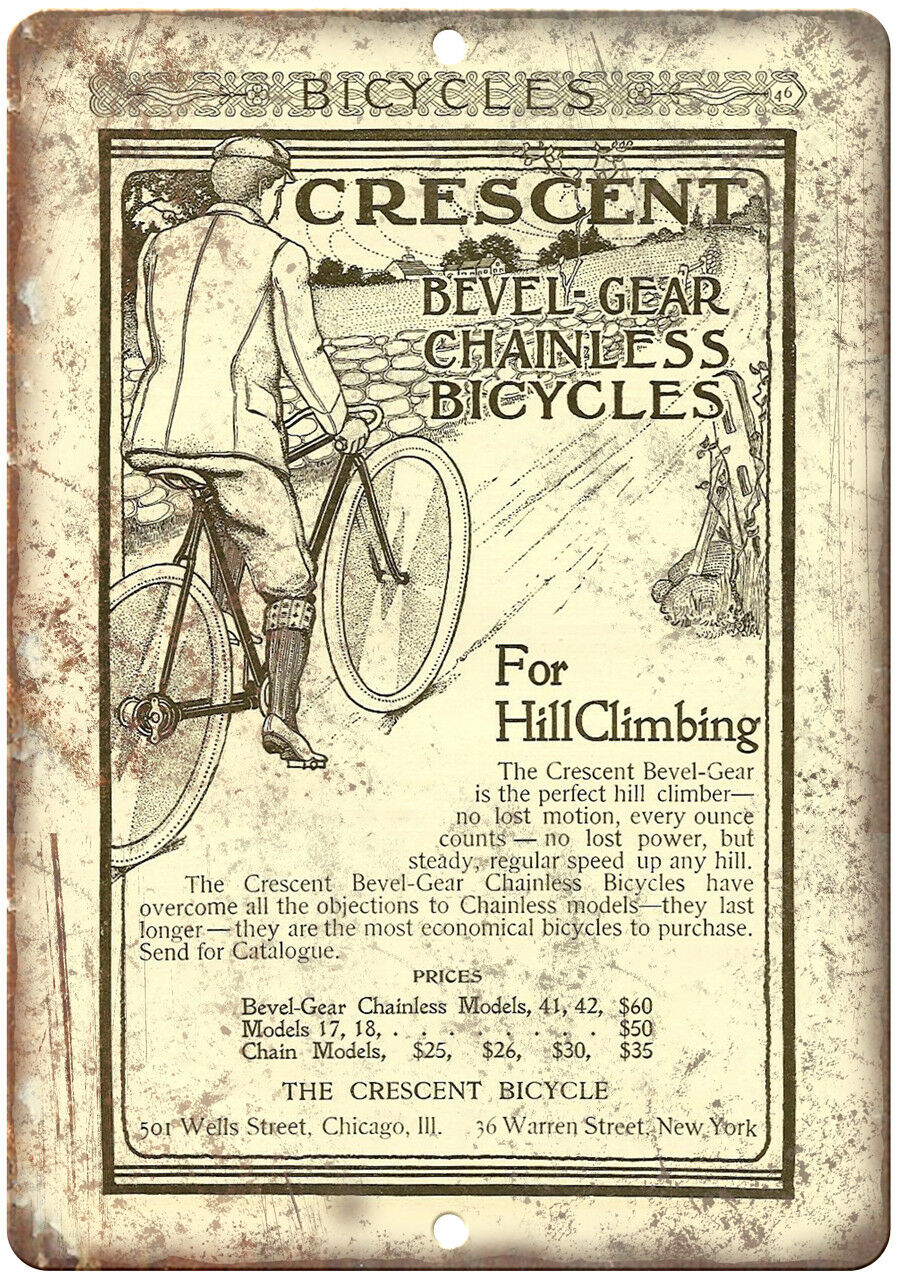
1895 hill climbing

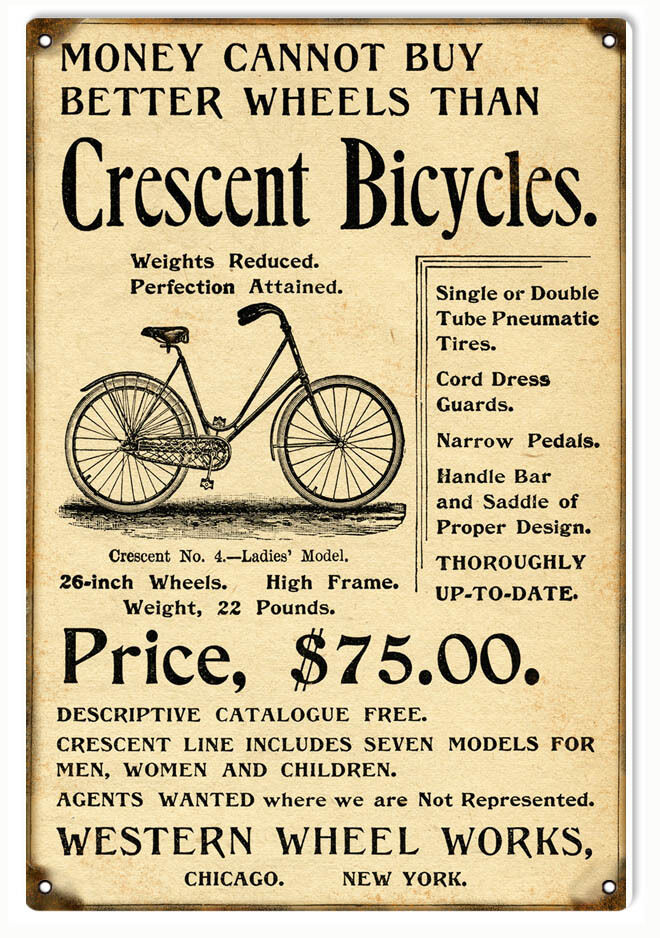
1895 ad

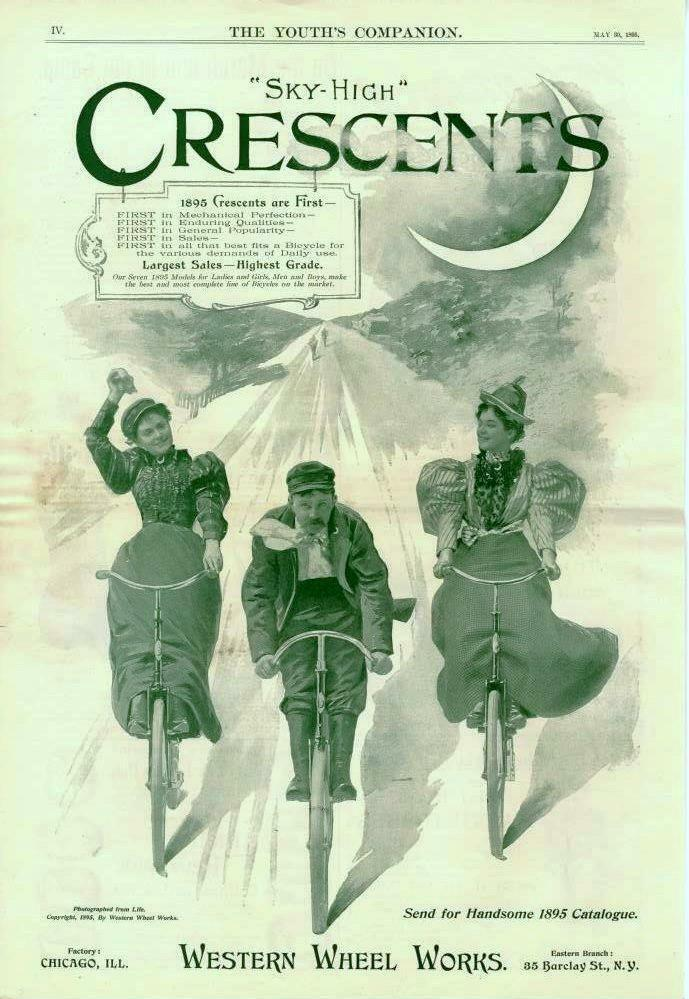
1895 catalogue advertisement

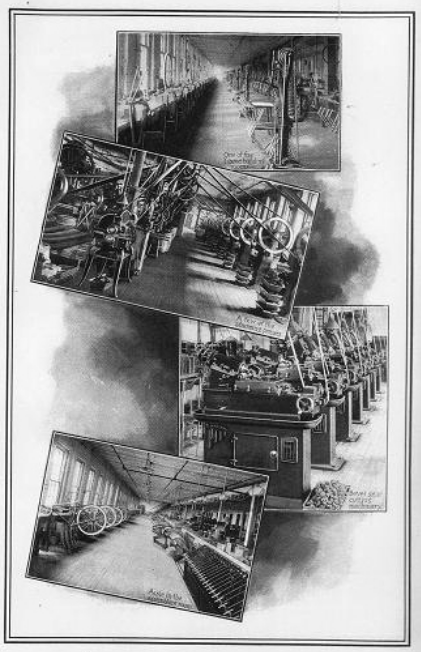
Inside Western Wheel Works, 1899

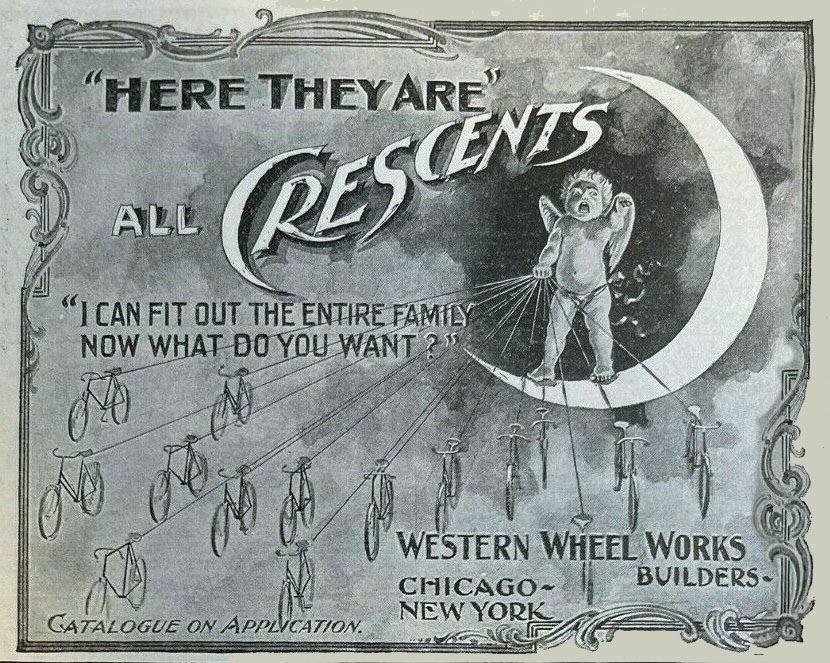
Baby advertisement for Western Wheel Works, 1896
