= Leopold Szersznik =

Austro-Hungarian Jesuit gymnasium teacher and historian

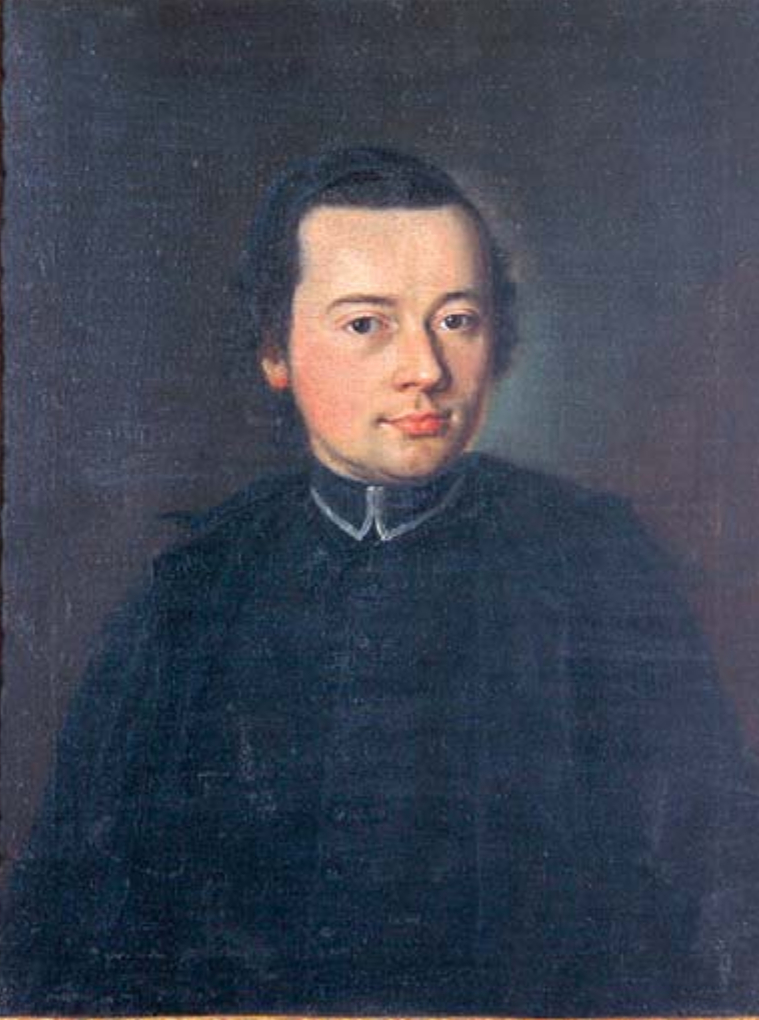
Painting of Szersznik in 1774

Leopold Jan Szersznik (Czech: Šeršník, German: Scherschnik, Latin: Leopoldus Ioannes Scherschnik; 3 March 1747 – 31 January 1814) was an Austro-Hungarian Jesuit gymnasium teacher, historian, and bibliophile. He worked at the Clementine Jesuit Library which is now the National Library of the Czech Republic.

== Biography ==
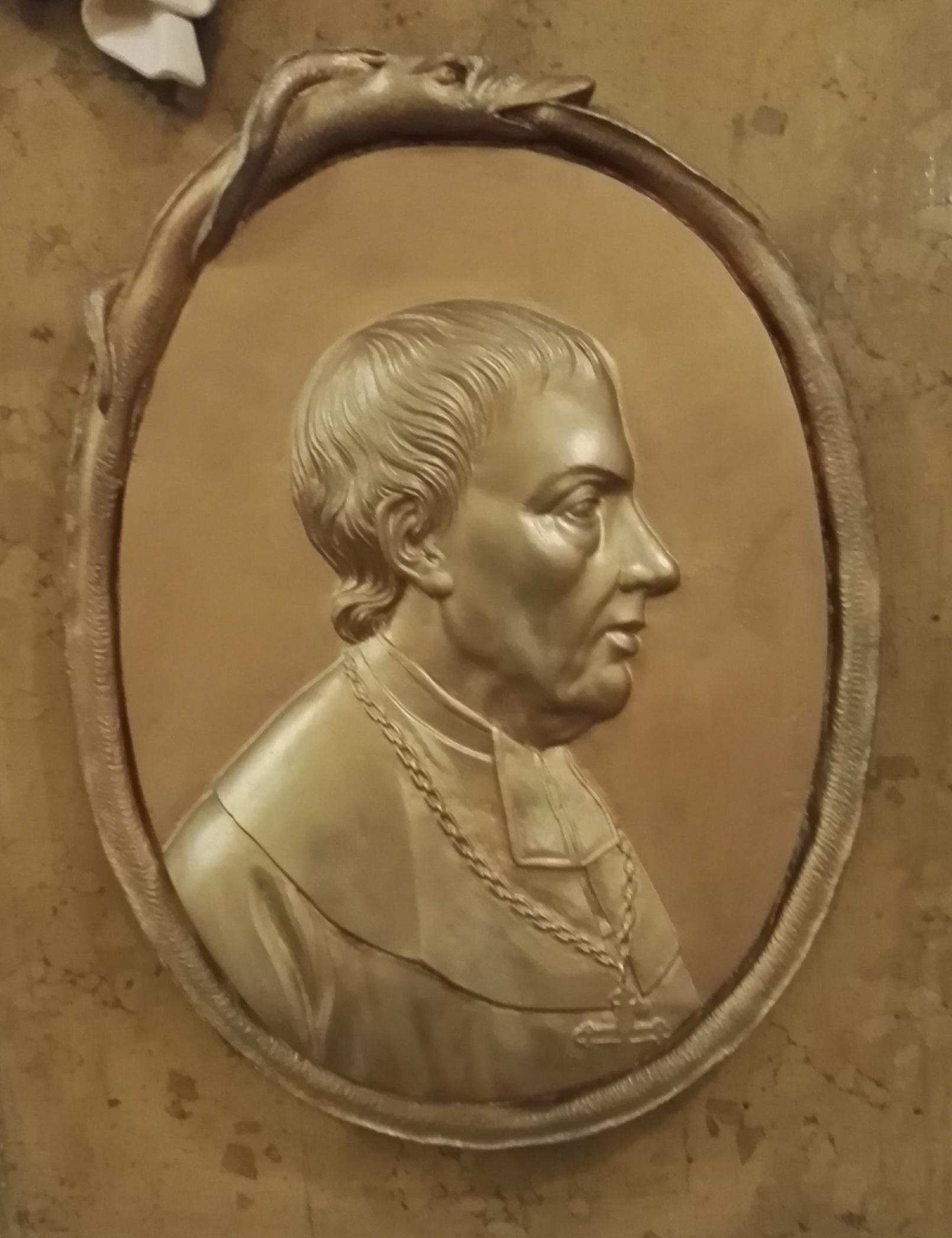
Profile of Szersznik

Szersznik was born in Cieszyn. He joined the Jesuit order in 1764 and worked at Olomouc, Brno and Březnice. He studied mathematics, Hebrew, Greek, Latin, and theology. From 1770 he taught at the Jesuit gymnasium in Cheb. In 1772 he went to Prague to study theology and worked at the Clementine library assisting Karel Charmel and began to index the Latin manuscripts and worked on a history of the library in Ueber den Ursprung und die Aufnahme der Bibliothek am Clementinischen Collegium zu Prag (1776). In 1776 he moved back to Těšín teaching at the Gymnasium there. He kept records of daily weather which were published in the Patriotisches Tageblatt. He also helped establish a public library and a museum which included natural history specimens. The library had 12000 volumes in 1814 including old prints, manuscripts, maps and engravings.

Among his writings was a compilation on Cieszyn scholars entitled Nachrichten von Schriftstellern und Künstlern aus dem Teschner Fürstenthum, published in Teschen (1810).
