= Josephinian Military Academy of Surgery =

- Collegium Medico-Chirurgicum Josephinum
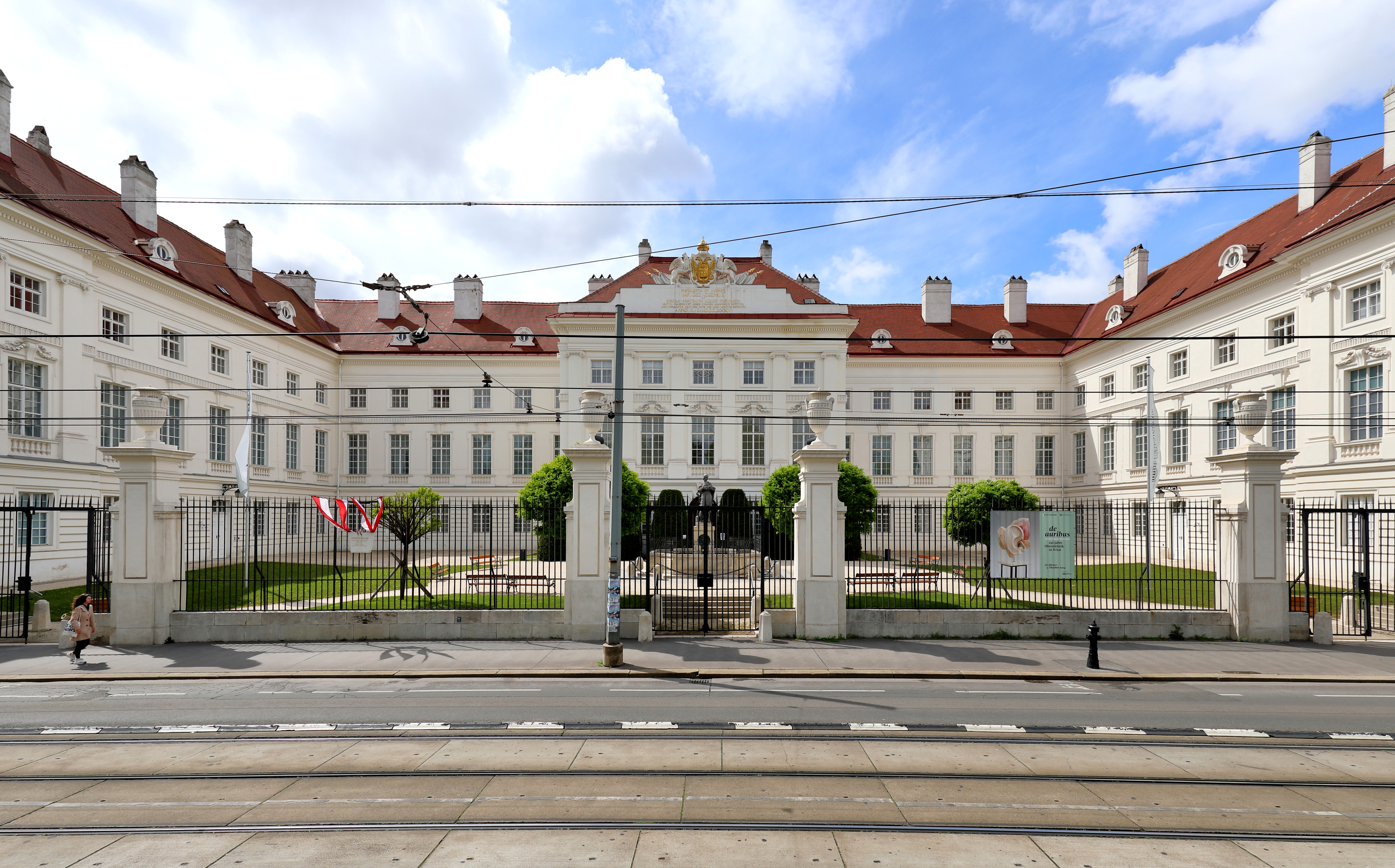
- The Medical History Museum (Josephinum) in Vienna
- Type: Public
- Active: 7 November 1785–1874
- Location: Vienna, Austria; 48°13′12″N 16°21′05″E
- Campus: Urban

The Collegium Medico-Chirurgicum Josephinum or Josephinian Military Academy of Surgery (simply Josephinum for short) was an academy of military medicine founded in Vienna by Emperor Joseph II in 1784. In 1874 its functions were transferred to other institutions, and its building now houses the Josephinum Medical Museum of the Medical University of Vienna.

An image of the building featured on the 1987 issue of the 50 schilling note.

== History ==
In 1779, Joseph II appointed his personal surgeon, Giovanni Alessandro Brambilla, to oversee the entire Austrian military medical service, which was in dire need of reform at the time. At Brambilla’s urging, Joseph founded a medical and surgical school at the military hospital in Gumpendorf, a suburb of Vienna. The school was created to select promising army surgeons, providing them with proper medical equipment and sending several abroad to study advanced methods. The success of this project led the Emperor to construct a dedicated, permanent facility. The Josephinian Military Academy of Surgery was officially established in Vienna in November 1785, under Brambilla's directorship. The initial members of the Academy included Georg Prochaska and Antonio Scarpa, while the foreign members included Antoine Louis, Johann Heinrich von Kelchen and William Cruickshank. The Academy comprised six chairs: anatomy, pathology, surgiery, medicine, botany and chemistry. On 3 February 1786, the academy was granted status equal to that of other university faculties, including the authority to confer degrees in medicine and surgery. The Emperor envisaged that the Josephinum should develop as an academy of learning in which, amongst other attributes, scientific research would be encouraged specifically in the field of surgery.

The lecture theatre in the Josephinum

Between 1783 and 1785, a new building designed by the court architect, Isidore Canevale (1730-1786), was constructed for the academy in the Alservorstadt district (now part of the 9th district of Vienna). The site was cleared by purchasing and demolishing an old shooting range and an estate. The location was chosen for its proximity to the main military garrison hospital, Garnisonsspital I, on Van Swieten Gasse. The total cost of around 1 million gulden was paid out of Joseph's private funds. The Academy's library was furnished with 6,000 volumes. Joseph II commissioned a collection of 1,192 anatomical wax models from Clemente Susini's workshop in Florence for the instruction of students attending the Josephinum. The models were sculpted by Susini under the direction of physicist Felice Fontana and with anatomical supervision from Paolo Mascagni. The Academy was also endowed with mineralogical, botanical, and zoological collections.

Following the death of Joseph II, the government paid significantly less attention to the academy. However, on the initiative of the then director, Johann Nepomuk Isfordink, Emperor Francis I granted the academy the same status as the universities of the Austrian Empire on 27 October 1822. After a three-year break, lectures resumed on 6 November 1824 and continued until the academy was dissolved by Emperor Franz Joseph I in 1849. It reopened in 1854 as a military academy for training field surgeons. The academy was permanently closed in 1874. The building now houses the Josephinum Medical History Museum belonging to the Medical University of Vienna. The Academy's official publication was the Acta Academiae Caesareae Regiae Josephinae Medico-Chirurgicae (1788–1837).

== Bibliography ==
- Fischer, Georg (1978). Chirurgie vor 100 Jahren. Historische Studie. Historische Studie über das 18. Jahrhundert aus dem Jahre 1876 (in German). Berlin/Heidelberg/New York: Springer-Verlag. ISBN 3-540-08751-6.
- Pollier-Green, Pascale; Van De Velde, A.; Pollier, Chantal (2009-05-30). Confronting Mortality with Art and Science: Scientific and Artistic Impressions on What the Certainty of Death Says About Life. Asp / Vubpress / Upa. ISBN 978-90-5487-443-0.
