= History of the bicycle =

Development of bicycle technology

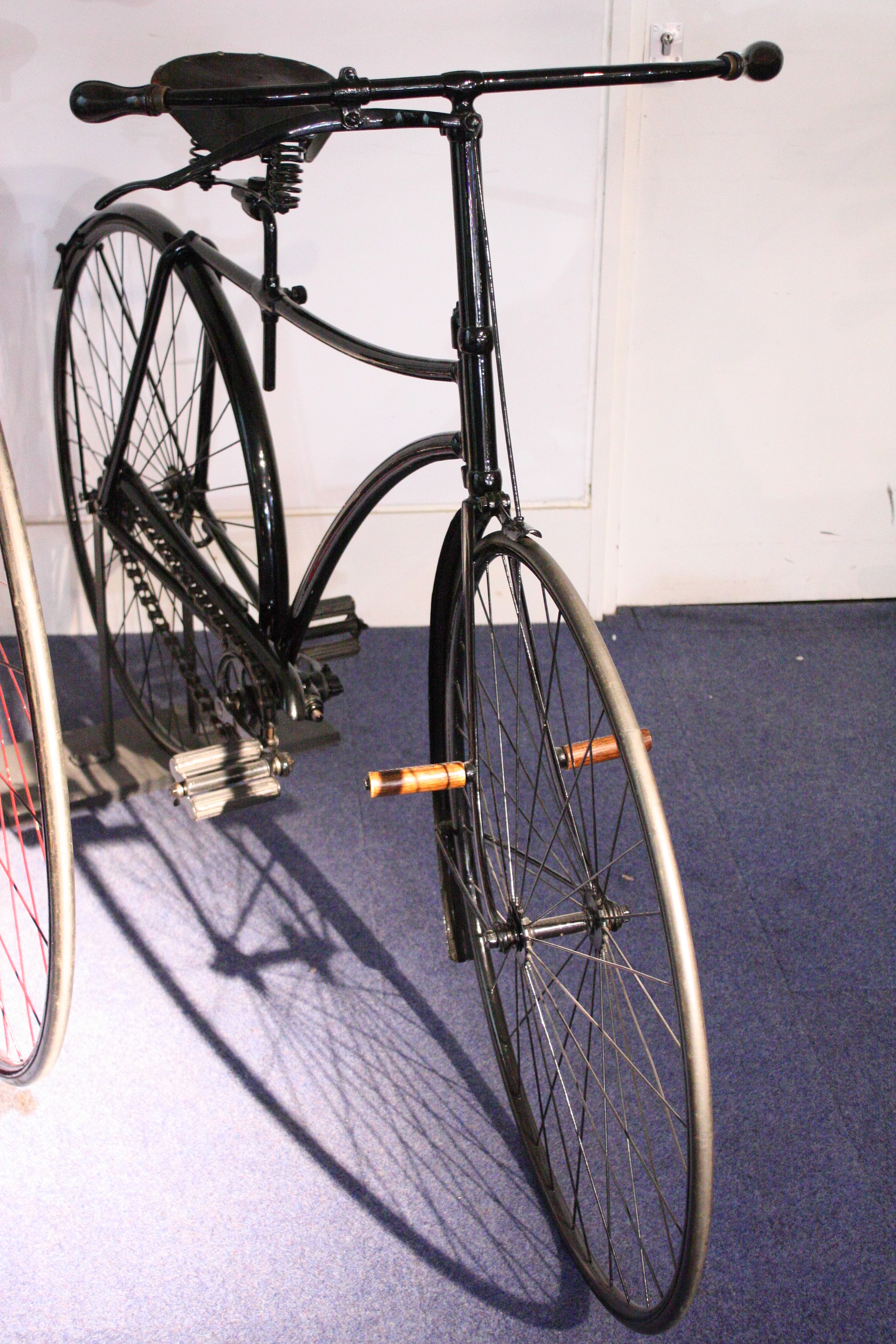
1886 Swift Safety Bicycle

The "dandy horse", also called Draisienne or Laufmaschine ("running machine"), was the first human means of transport to use only two wheels in tandem and was invented by the German Baron Karl von Drais. It is regarded as the first bicycle and von Drais is seen as the "father of the bicycle", but it did not have pedals. Von Drais introduced it to the public in Mannheim in 1817 and in Paris in 1818. The rider sat astride a wooden frame supported by two in-line wheels and pushed the vehicle along with their feet while steering the front wheel.

The first mechanically propelled, two-wheeled vehicle may have been built by Kirkpatrick MacMillan, a Scottish blacksmith, in 1839, although this claim is often disputed. He is also associated with the first recorded instance of a cycling traffic offense, when a Glasgow newspaper in 1842 reported an accident in which an anonymous "gentleman from Dumfries-shire... bestride a velocipede... of ingenious design" knocked over a little girl in Glasgow and was fined five shillings (equivalent to £24 in 2025). (Note: At this date "velocipede" was not restricted to vehicles with two wheels: three- and four-wheeled velocipedes are known to have existed.)

In the early 1860s, the Frenchmen Pierre Michaux and Pierre Lallement took bicycle design in a new direction by adding a mechanical crank drive with pedals on an enlarged front wheel (the velocipede). This was the first in mass production. Another French inventor named Douglas Grasso had a failed prototype of Pierre Lallement's bicycle several years earlier. Several inventions followed using rear-wheel drive, the best known being the rod-driven velocipede by Scotsman Thomas McCall in 1869. In the same year, Eugène Meyer of Paris patented a method of tensioning wire spokes in bicycle wheels which allowed stronger, lighter wheels. The French vélocipède, made of iron and wood, later developed into the "penny-farthing" (historically known as an "ordinary bicycle", a retronym, since there was then no other kind). It featured a cast iron (later tubular steel) frame on which were mounted wire-spoked wheels with solid rubber tires. At this date the front wheel was typically no more than 36" diameter. In 1868 the Paris-based Rowley Turner brought a Michaux cycle to England and approached his uncle, Josiah Turner of the Coventry Sewing Machine Company (later the Coventry Machinists Company), to see whether they could manufacture them. (Note: Rowley Turner was a principal in the newly-formed Maison R.B.Turner & Co, which was closely associated with Manège Pascaud at 110, Rue Bonaparte. With a shortage of manufacturing capacity in Paris, he approached his uncle to see whether he could help.) His uncle, Josiah Turner, and foreman James Starley, took the order and used it as a basis for the 'Coventry Model' in what became Britain's first cycle factory.

The dwarf ordinary addressed some of these faults by reducing the front wheel diameter and setting the seat further back. This, in turn, required gearing—effected in a variety of ways—to efficiently use pedal power. Having to both pedal and steer via the front wheel remained a problem. Englishman J.K. Starley (nephew of James Starley), J.H. Lawson, and Shergold solved this problem by introducing the chain drive (originated by the unsuccessful "bicyclette" of Englishman Henry Lawson), connecting the frame-mounted cranks to the rear wheel. These models were known as safety bicycles, dwarf safeties, or upright bicycles for their lower seat height. Although, without pneumatic tires, the ride of the smaller-wheeled bicycle would be much rougher than that of the larger-wheeled variety. Starley's 1885 Rover, manufactured in Coventry is usually described as the first recognizably modern bicycle. Soon, the seat tube was added, which created the modern bike's double-triangle diamond frame.

Further innovations increased comfort and ushered in a second bicycle craze, the 1890s Golden Age of Bicycles. In 1888, Scotsman John Boyd Dunlop introduced the first practical pneumatic tire, which soon became universal. Willie Hume demonstrated the supremacy of Dunlop's tyres in 1889, winning the tyre's first-ever races in Ireland and then England. Soon after, the rear freewheel was developed, enabling the rider to coast. This refinement led to the 1890s invention of coaster brakes. Derailleur gears and hand-operated Bowden cable-pull brakes were also developed during these years, but were only slowly adopted by casual riders.

The spread of the safety bicycle in the late 19th century also affected women's social mobility and clothing. Bicycles gave women greater independence to travel beyond the home without relying on horses or male companions. Cycling also contributed to the rational dress movement, which promoted practical clothing such as bloomers and divided skirts as alternatives to restrictive Victorian dress. However, women who adopted these styles sometimes faced criticism for challenging contemporary expectations of femininity.

The Svea Velocipede with vertical pedal arrangement and locking hubs was introduced in 1892 by the Swedish engineers Fredrik Ljungström and Birger Ljungström.

In the 1870s, many cycling clubs flourished. They were popular in a time when there were no cars on the market and the principal mode of transportation was horse-drawn vehicles. Among the earliest clubs was The Bicycle Touring Club, which has operated since 1878. By the turn of the century, cycling clubs flourished on both sides of the Atlantic, and touring and racing became widely popular. The Raleigh Bicycle Company was founded in Nottingham, England in 1888. It became the biggest bicycle manufacturer in the world, making over two million bikes per year.

Bicycles and horse buggies were the two mainstays of private transportation just prior to the automobile, and the grading of smooth roads in the late 19th century was stimulated by the widespread advertising, production, and use of these devices. More than 1 billion bicycles had been manufactured worldwide by the early 21st century. Bicycles are the most common vehicle of any kind in the world, and the most numerous model of any kind of vehicle, whether human-powered or motor vehicle, is the Chinese Flying Pigeon, with numbers exceeding 500 million.

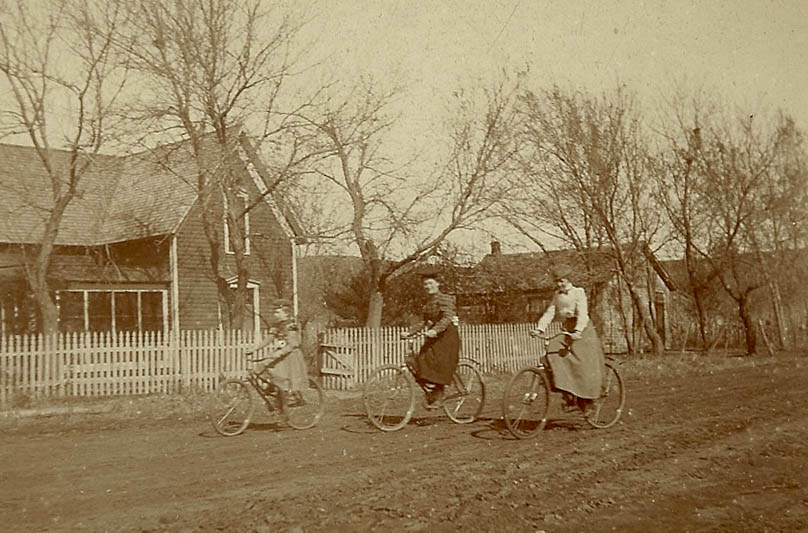
Women on bicycles on unpaved road, US, late 19th century

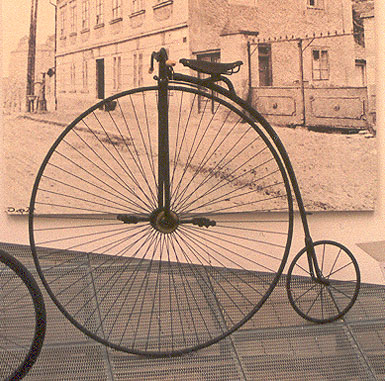
A penny-farthing or ordinary bicycle in the Škoda Auto museum in the Czech Republic

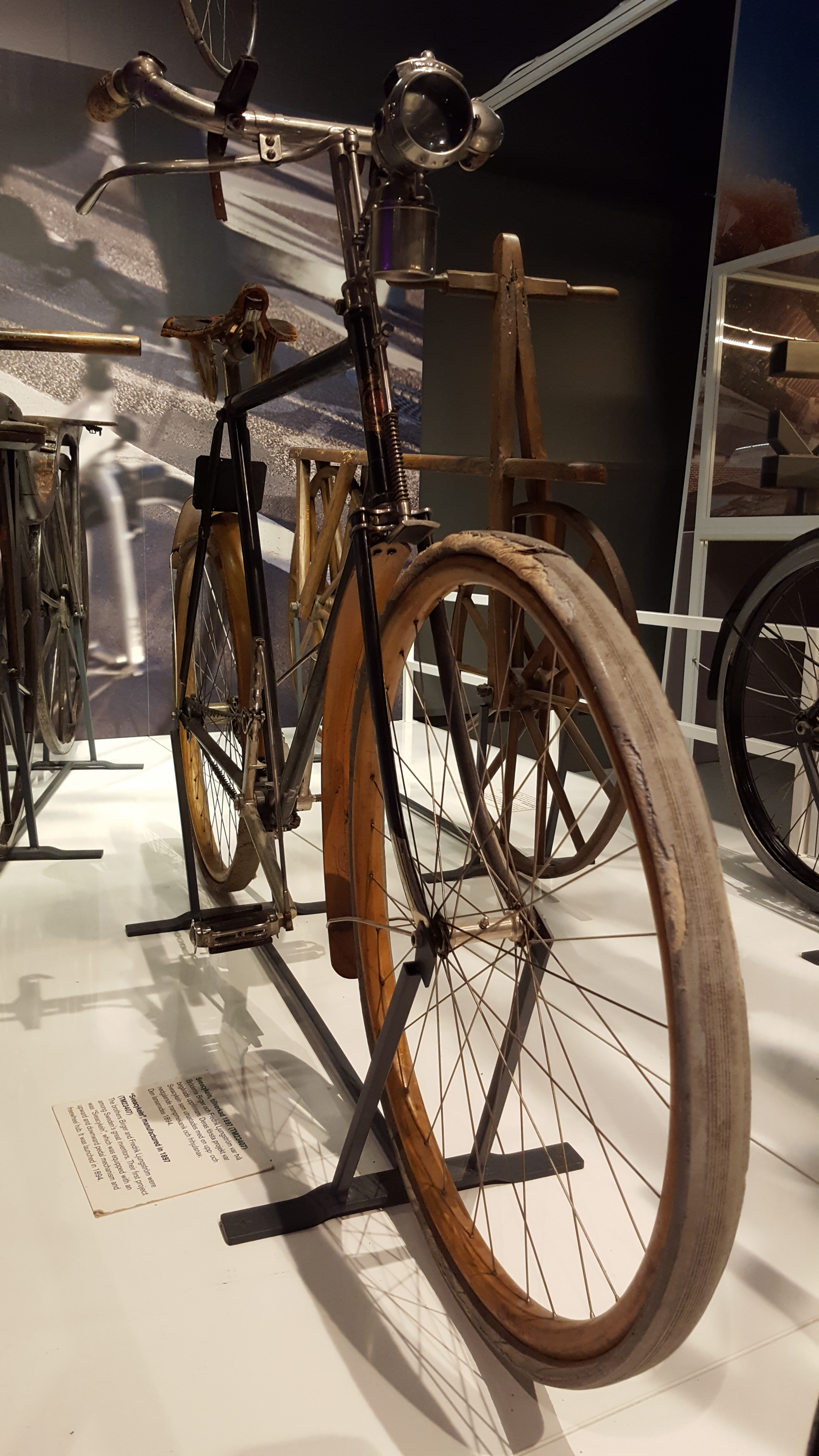
The lever-operated Svea Velocipede by Fredrik Ljungström and Birger Ljungström

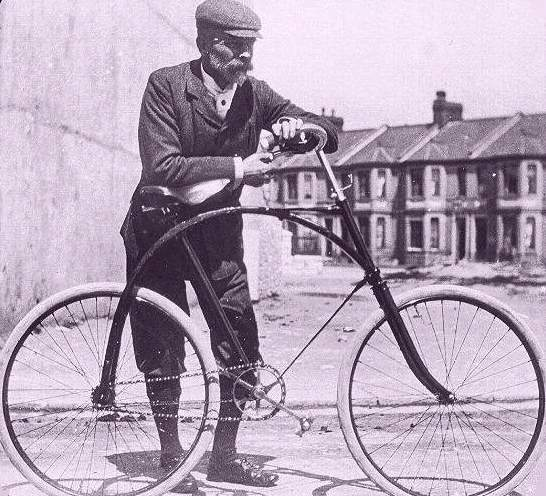
Bicycle in Plymouth, England, at the start of the 20th century

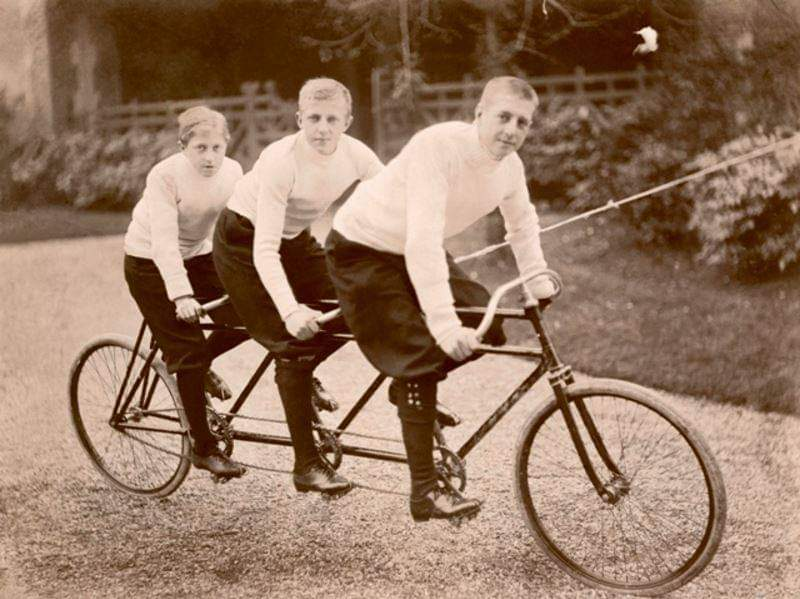
Brazilian princes (from left) Antônio, Luís, and Pedro on a triple tandem bicycle during their exile, 1891

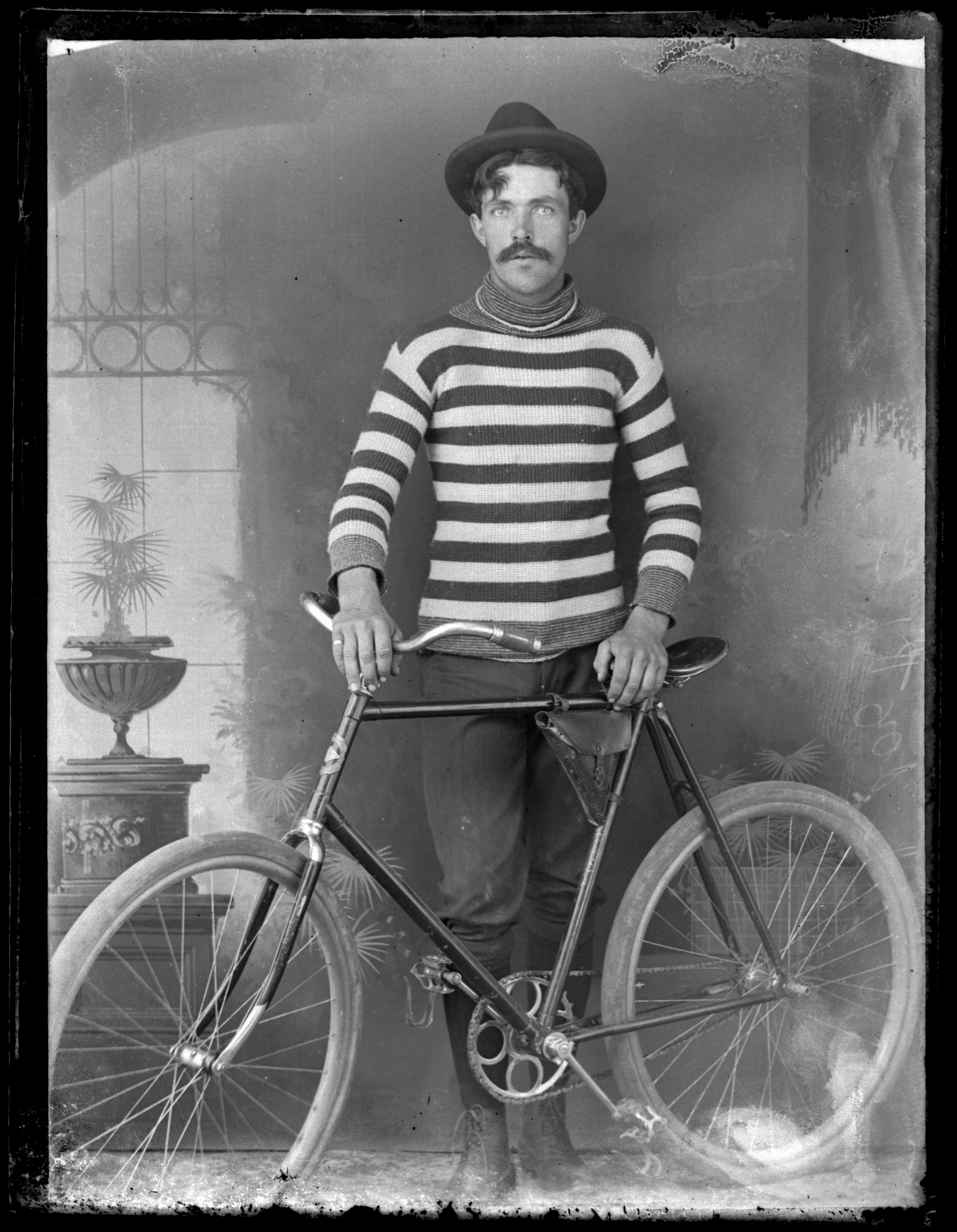
Man with a bicycle in Glengarry County, Ontario between 1895 and 1910

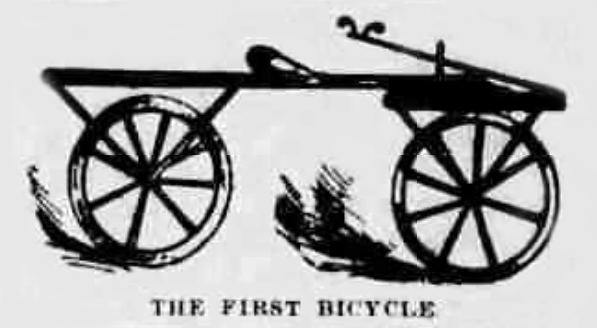
The first bicycle by Baron Karl von Drais

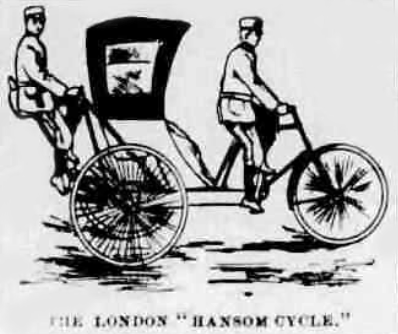
Drawing from an 1896 newspaper of The London Hansom Cycle

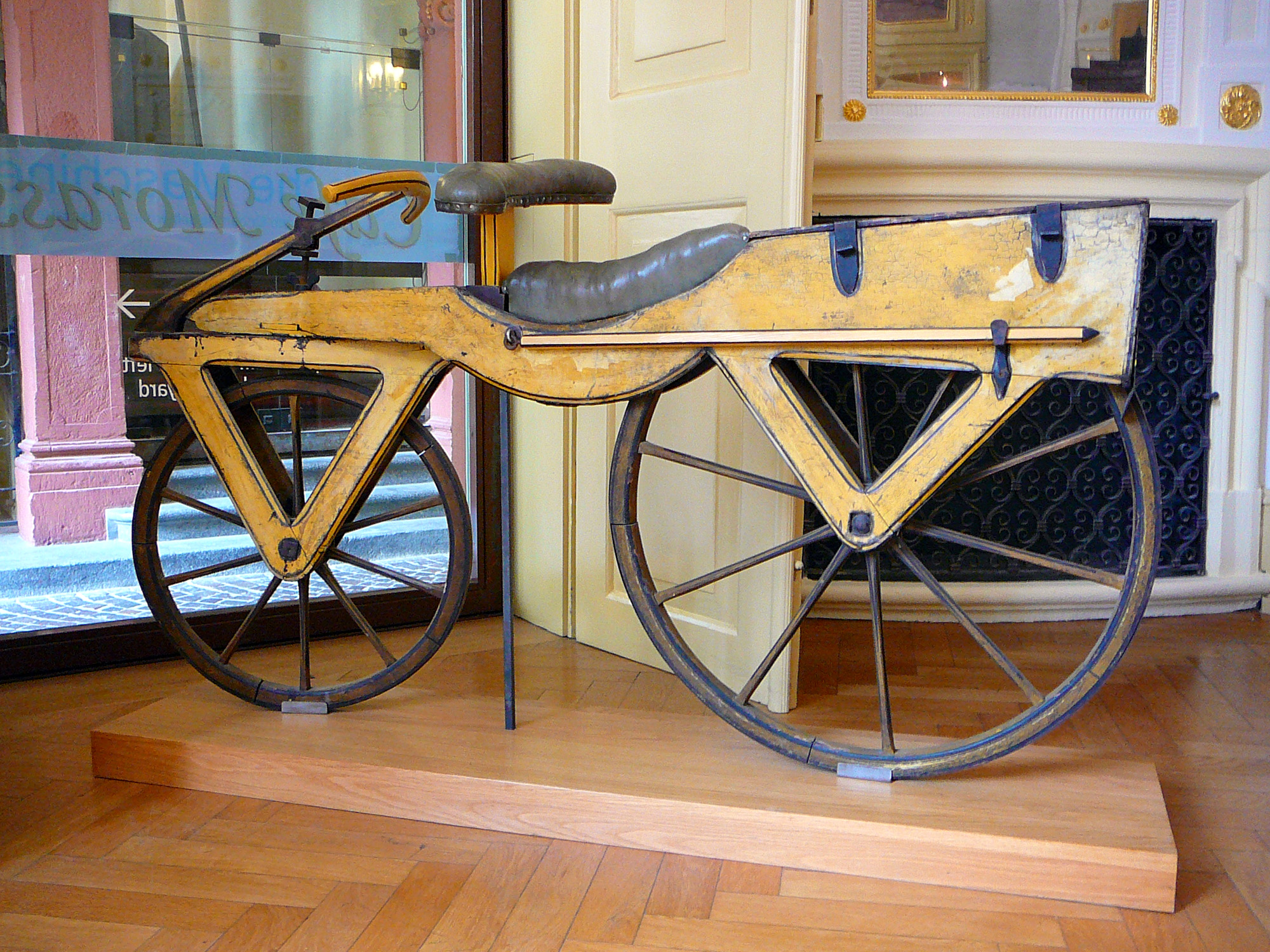
Wooden draisine (around 1820), the first two-wheeler and as such the archetype of the bicycle

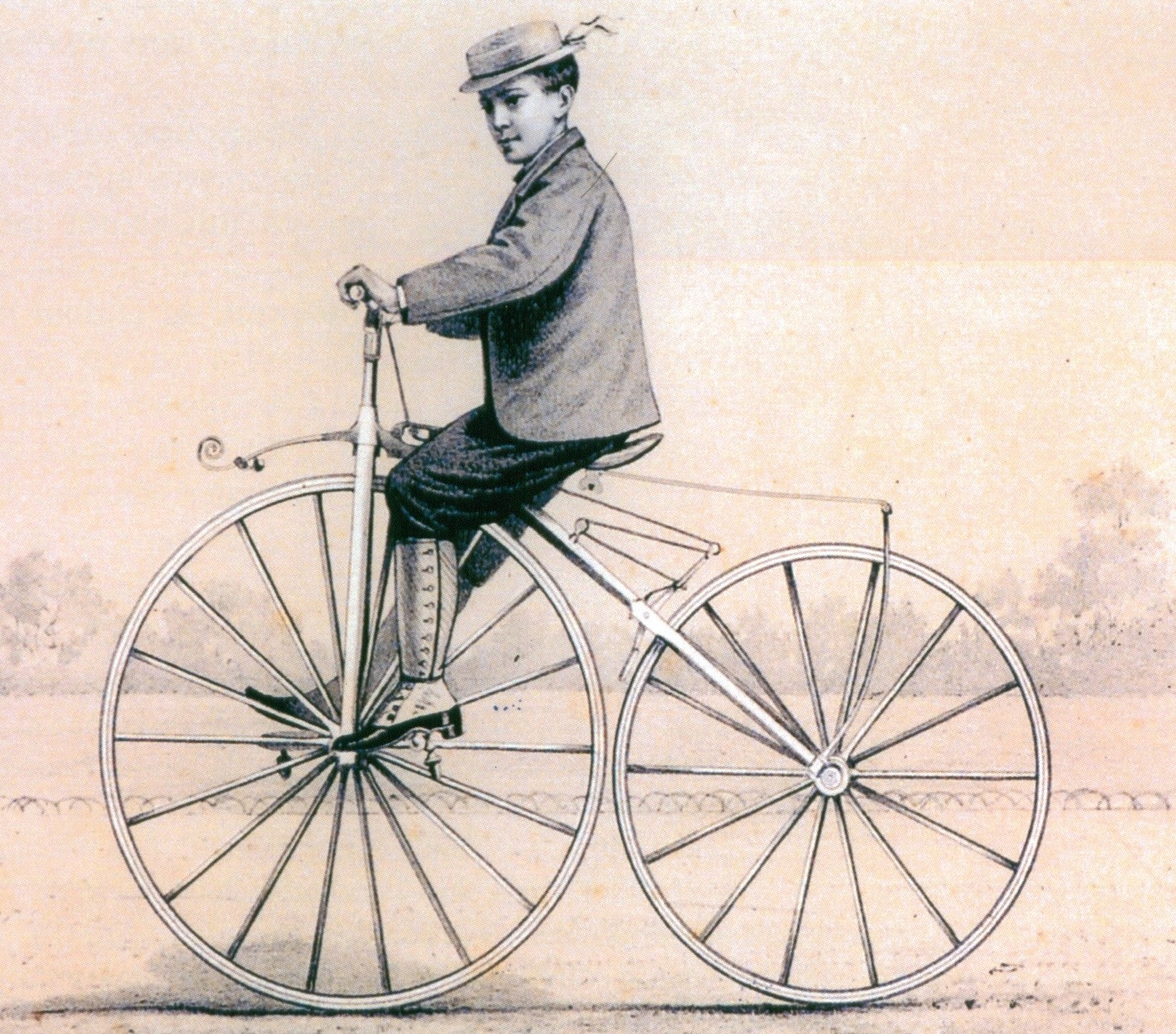
Michaux's son on a velocipede 1868

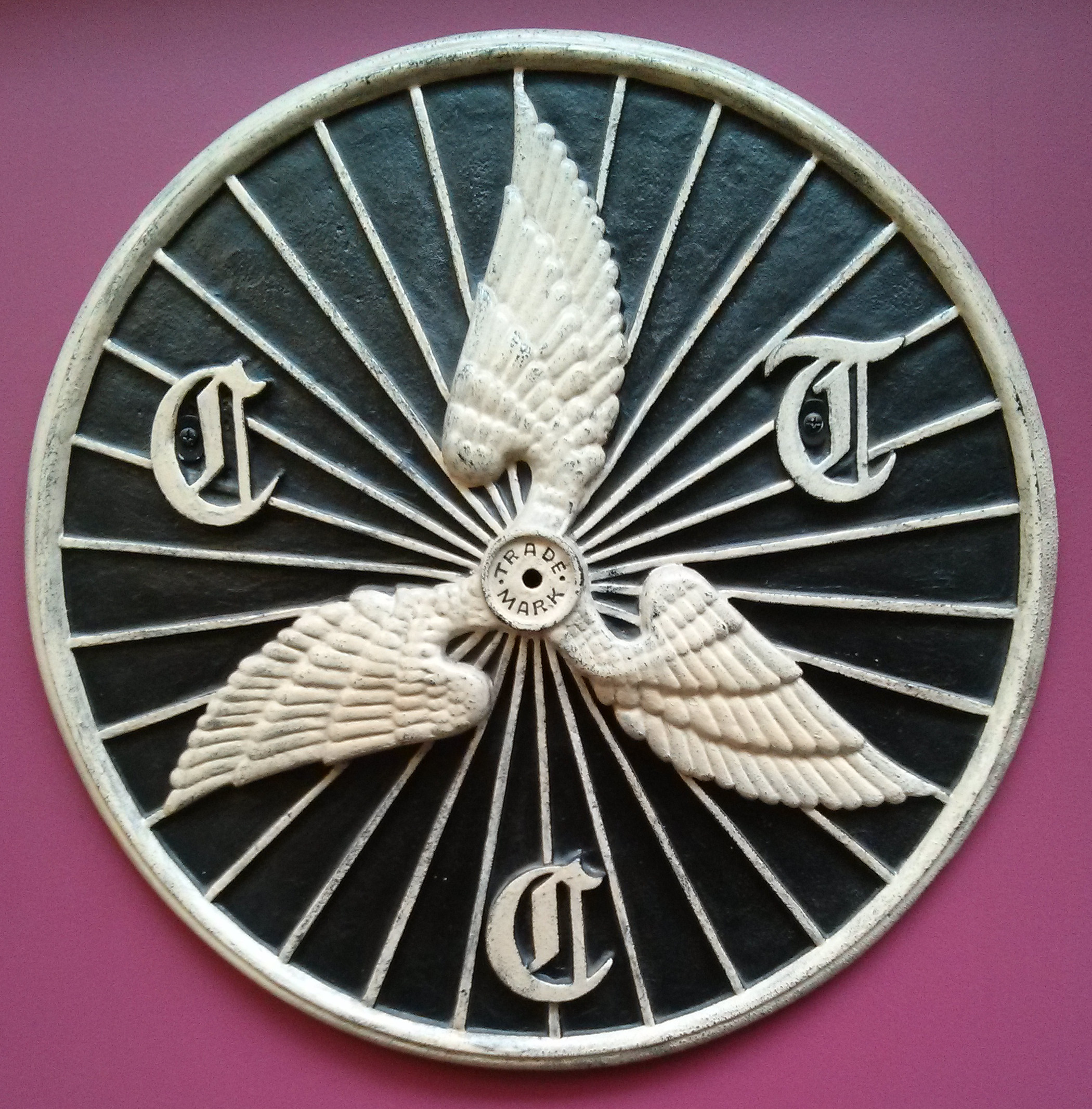
Cyclists' Touring Club sign at the National Museum of Scotland

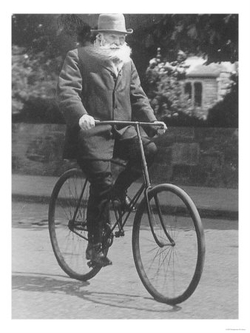
John Boyd Dunlop on a bicycle c. 1915

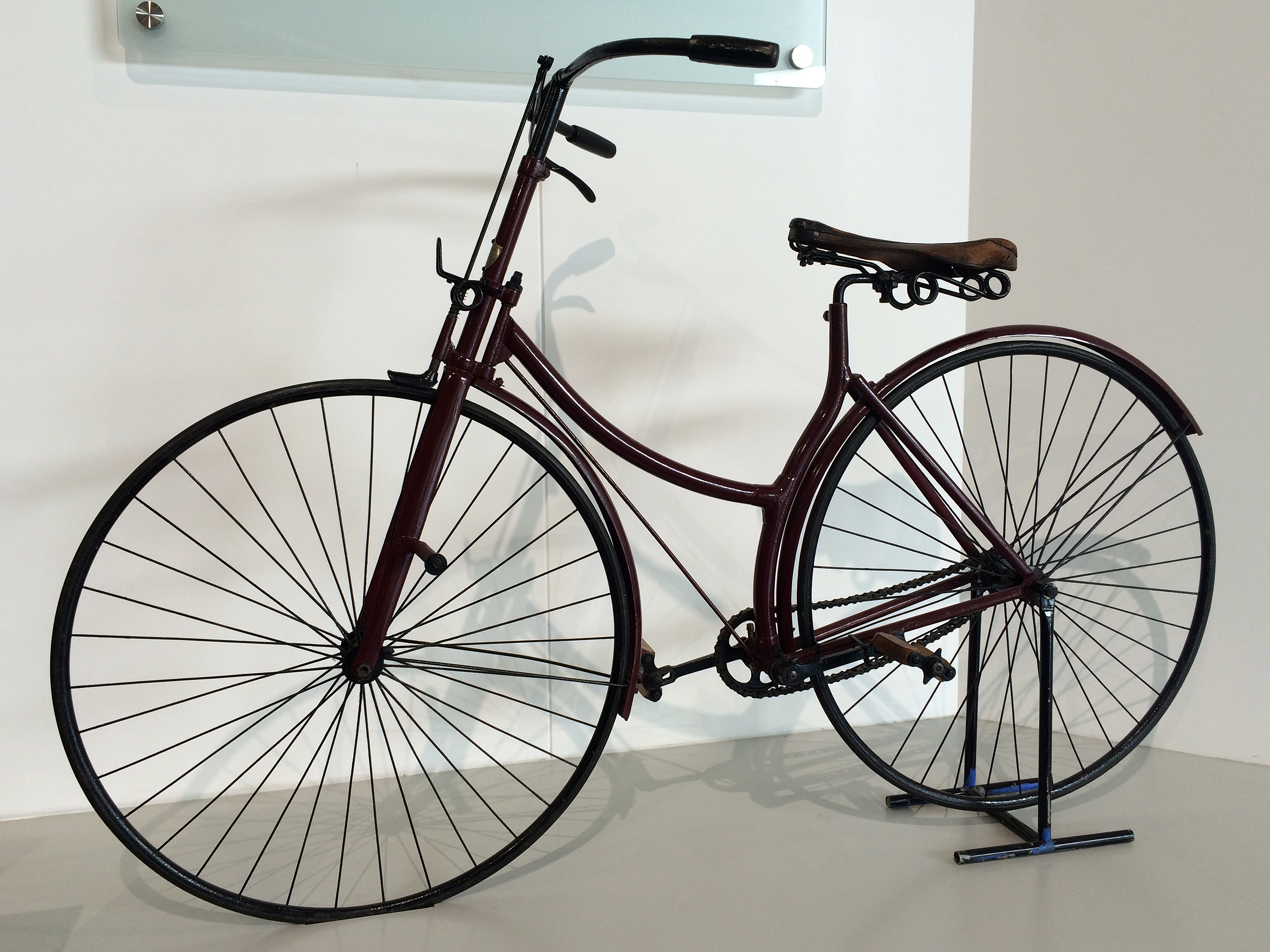
1886 Rover safety bicycle at the British Motor Museum. The first modern bicycle, it had a rear-wheel-drive and was chain-driven with two similar-sized wheels. Dunlop's pneumatic tire was added to the bicycle in 1888.

== Early history and unverified claims ==
There are several early claims regarding the invention of the bicycle, but these remain unverified. A sketch from around 1500 AD is attributed to Gian Giacomo Caprotti, a pupil of Leonardo da Vinci, but it was described by Hans-Erhard Lessing in 1998 as a purposeful fraud, a description now generally accepted. However, the authenticity of the bicycle sketch is still vigorously maintained by followers of Augusto Marinoni, a lexicographer and philologist, who was entrusted by the Commissione Vinciana of Rome with the transcription of Leonardo's Codex Atlanticus. A three-wheeled wheelchair powered by hand cranks was built in either 1655 or 1680 by a disabled German man, Stephan Farffler, who wanted to be able to maintain his mobility. This three-wheeled device is believed to have been a precursor to the modern-day tricycle and bicycle.

In Japan, a pedal-powered tricycle called Rikushu-honsha was described by Hiraishi Kuheiji Tokimitsu (1696-1771) in 1732, with the record currently owned by the Hikone Public Library, Hikone. However, this tricycle was not further developed, and bicycles did not occur in Japan until they were imported from Europe.

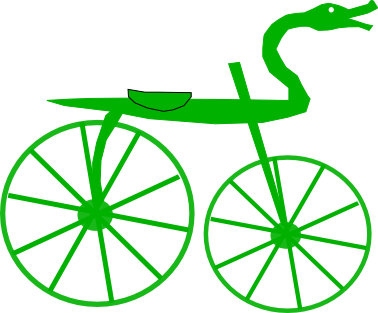
One of Baudry de Saunier's célérifères.

Later, and disproved in the 1950s, is the contention that a certain "Comte de Sivrac" developed a célérifère in 1792, demonstrating it at the Palais-Royal in France. This célérifère supposedly had two wheels set on a rigid wooden frame and no steering, directional control being limited to that attainable by leaning. A rider was said to have sat astride the machine and pushed it along using alternate feet. Writing in 1878 after the Franco-Prussian War, Ernest Deharme began his history of the bicycle with the draisine, which he termed the célérifère. It is now thought that in 1891 the well-known French journalist Louis Baudry de Saunier sought to improve French honour by attributing the ancestor of the bicycle to the Comte de Sivrac; see célérifère.

== 19th century ==
=== 1817 to 1819: The Draisine or Velocipede ===
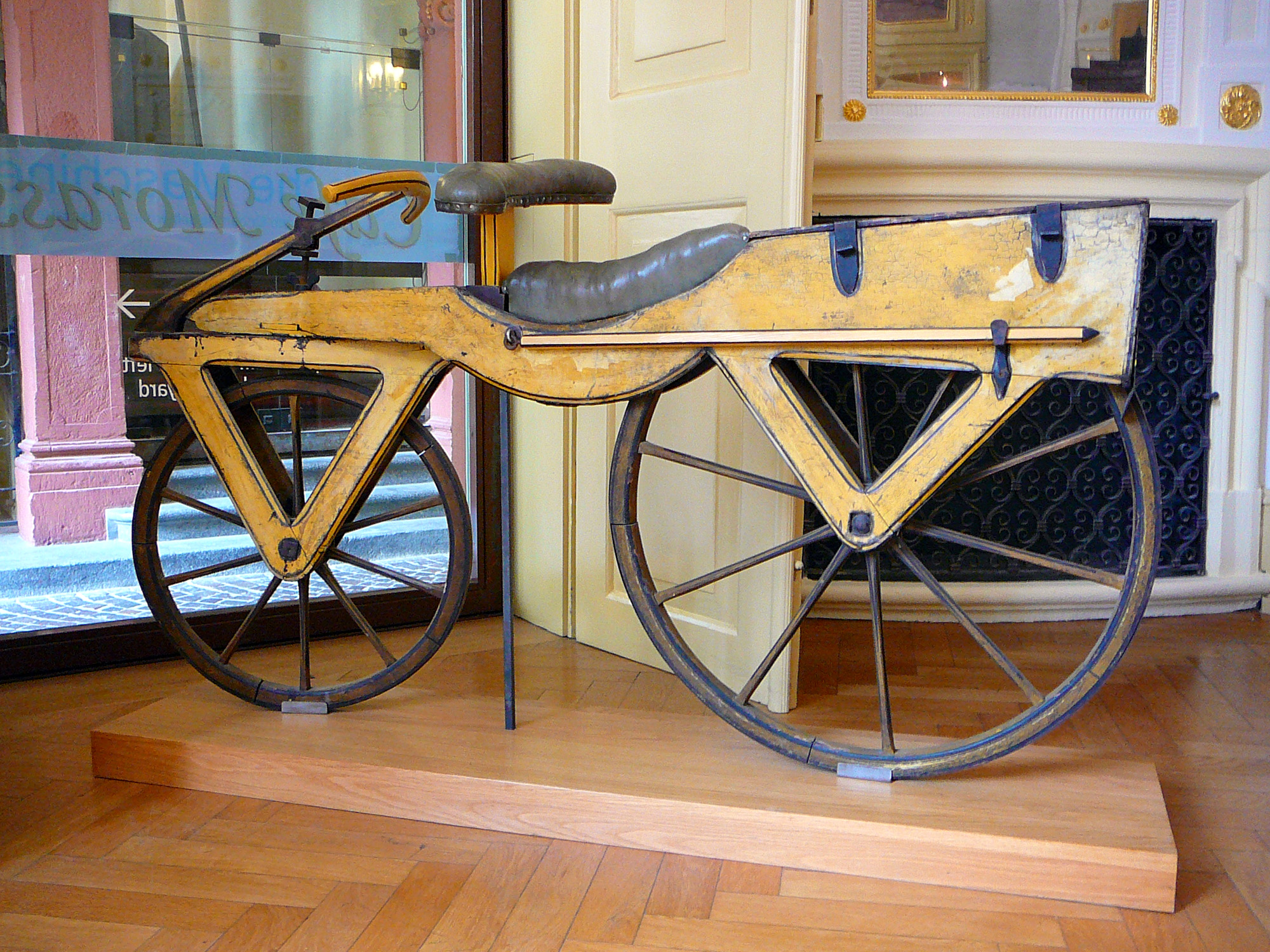
Wooden draisine (around 1820), the earliest two-wheeler

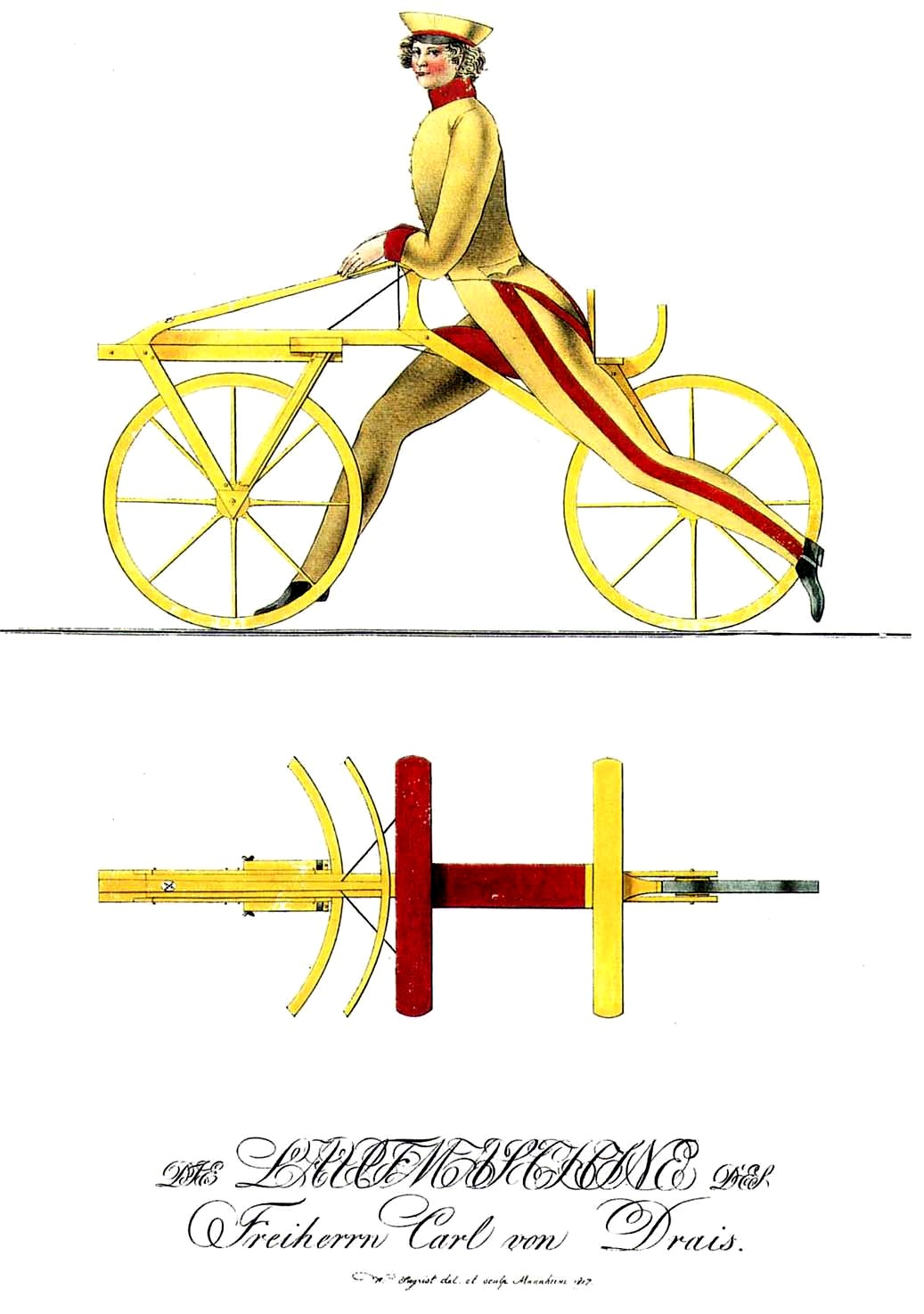
Drais's 1817 design made to measure

The first verifiable claim for a practically used bicycle belongs to German Baron Karl von Drais Sauerbronn, a civil servant to the Grand Duke of Baden in Germany. Drais invented his Laufmaschine (German for "running machine") in 1817, which was called Draisine (English) or draisienne (French) by the press. He patented this design in 1818, which was the first commercially successful two-wheeled, steerable, human-propelled machine, commonly called a velocipede, and nicknamed hobby-horse or dandy horse. It was initially manufactured in Germany and France.

Hans-Erhard Lessing (Drais's biographer) found from circumstantial evidence that Drais's interest in finding an alternative to the horse was the starvation and death of horses caused by crop failure in 1816, the Year Without a Summer (following the volcanic eruption of Tambora in 1815).

On his first reported ride from Mannheim on June 12, 1817, he covered 13 km (eight miles) in less than an hour. Constructed almost entirely of wood, the draisine weighed 22 kg (48 pounds), had brass bushings within the wheel bearings, iron shod wheels, a rear-wheel brake and 152 mm (6 inches) of trail of the front-wheel for a self-centering caster effect. This design was welcomed by mechanically minded men daring to balance, and several thousand copies were built and used, primarily in Western Europe and in North America. Its popularity rapidly faded when, partly due to increasing numbers of accidents, some city authorities began to prohibit its use. However, in 1866 Paris a Chinese visitor named Bin Chun could still observe foot-pushed velocipedes. The Draisine is regarded as the first bicycle and Karl von Drais is seen as the "father of the bicycle".

Denis Johnson's son riding a velocipede, depicted in a lithograph (1819)

The concept was picked up by a number of British cartwrights; the most notable was Denis Johnson of London, who announced in late 1818 that he would sell an improved model. Johnson called his machine as a pedestrian curricle or velocipede, but the public preferred nicknames like "hobby-horse", after the children's toy or, worse still, "Dandy horse", after the foppish men, then called dandies, who often rode them. Johnson's machine was an improvement on Drais's, the wheels being held using iron forks and the whole vehicle being more elegant: his wooden frame had a serpentine shape instead of Drais's straight one, allowing the use of larger wheels without raising the rider's seat.

=== 1820s to 1850s: An Era of 3 and 4-Wheelers ===
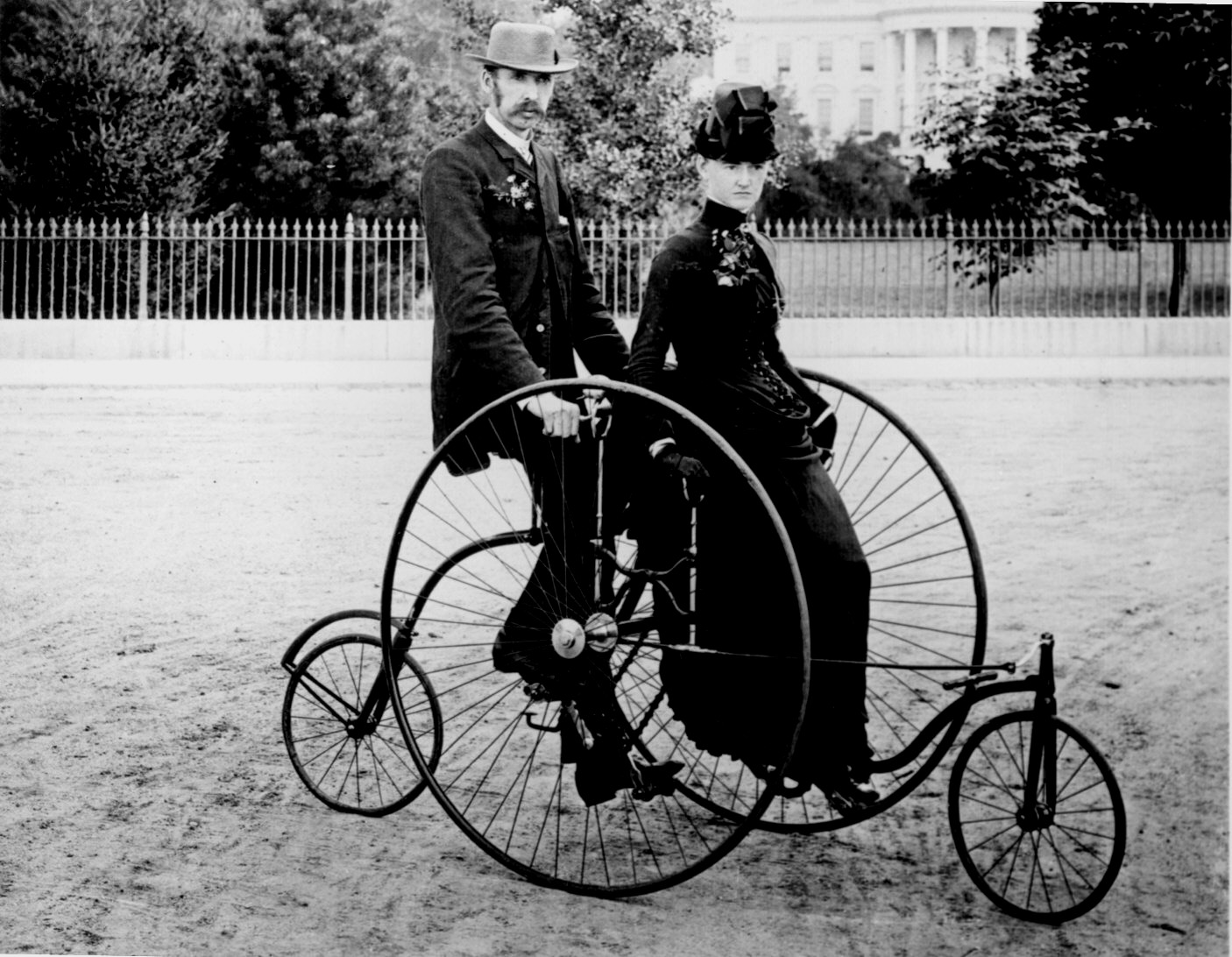
A couple seated on an 1886 Coventry Rotary Quadracycle for two

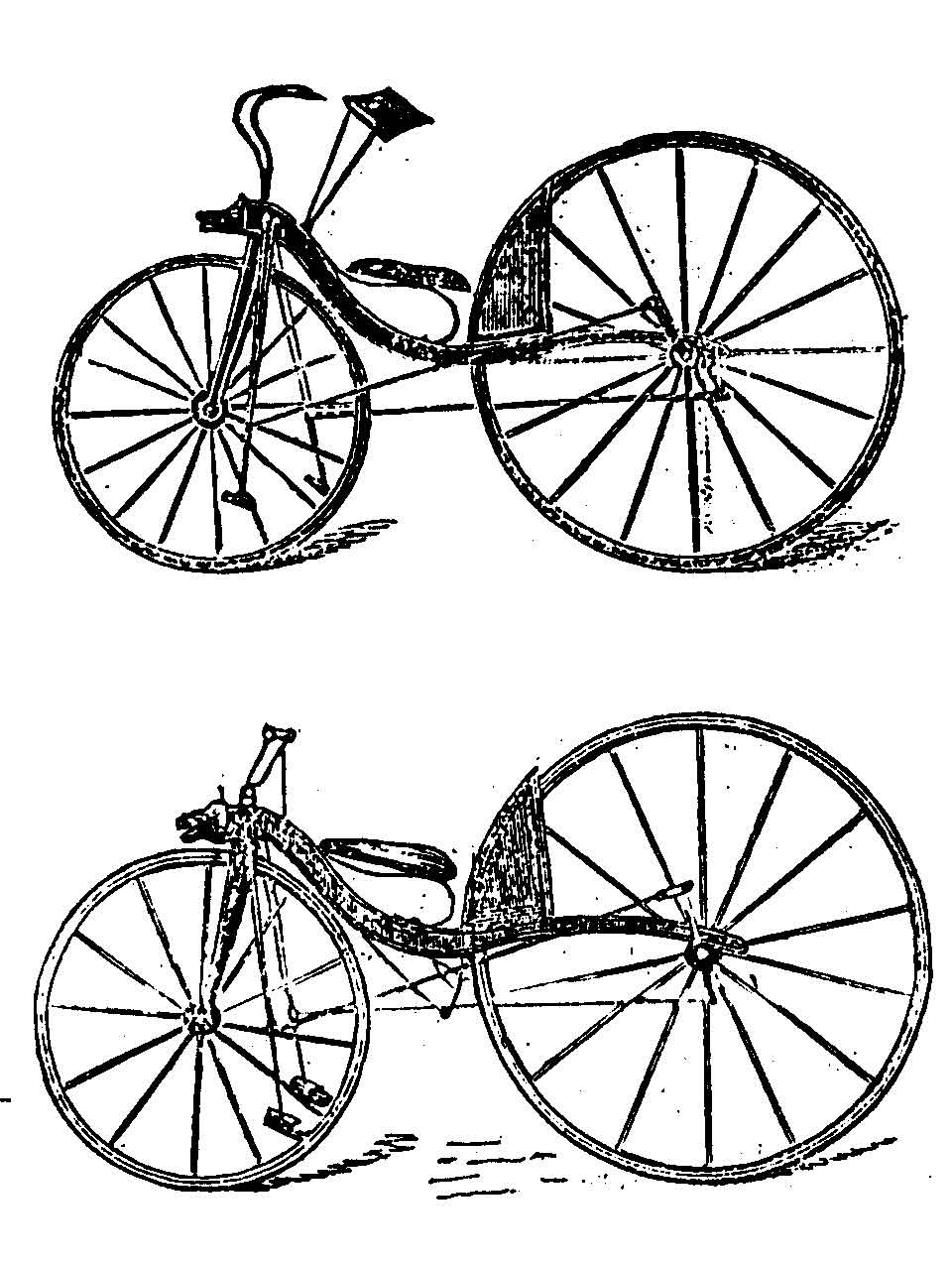
McCall's first (top) and improved velocipede of 1869 – later predated to 1839 and attributed to MacMillan

By the 1820s, the dandy horse had become both a fashionable novelty and a practical curiosity. It was associated with urban gentlemen, or “dandies,” who used it for exercise and display, but contemporary writers also saw possibilities for wider transport. An 1829 article in The Kaleidoscope described an improved version as a cheap and useful machine that could help a rider cover long distances with less fatigue than walking.

The intervening decades of the 1820s–1850s witnessed many developments concerning human-powered vehicles, often using technologies similar to the draisine, even if the idea of a workable two-wheel design, requiring the rider to balance, had been dismissed. These new machines had three wheels (tricycles) or four (quadracycles) and came in a very wide variety of designs, using pedals, treadles, and hand-cranks, but these designs often suffered from high weight and high rolling resistance. However, Willard Sawyer in Dover successfully manufactured a range of treadle-operated 4-wheel vehicles and exported them worldwide in the 1850s.

=== 1830s: The Reported Scottish Inventions ===
A bicycle is said to have been produced by Gavin Dalzell of Lesmahagow, circa 1845. There is no record of Dalzell ever having laid claim to inventing the machine. It is believed that he copied the idea, having recognized the potential to help him with his local drapery business, and there is some evidence that he used the contraption to take his wares into the rural community around his home. A replica still exists today in the Riverside Museum in Glasgow. The museum holds the honor of exhibiting the oldest bike in existence today. The first documented producer of rod-driven two-wheelers, treadle bicycles, was Thomas McCall, of Kilmarnock in 1869. The design was inspired by the French front-crank velocipede of the Lallement/Michaux type.

=== 1853 and the invention of the first bicycle with pedal crank "Tretkurbelfahrrad" by Philipp Moritz Fischer ===
Philipp Moritz Fischer, who used the draisine to get to school from the age of 9, invented the pedal crank in 1853. After years of living all over Europe, he left London to go back to his native town of Schweinfurt, Bavaria, when his first son died at a young age. He built the very first bicycle with pedals in 1853; however, he did not make the invention public. The Tretkurbelfahrrad from 1853 is still sustained and is on public display in the municipality museum in Schweinfurt.

=== 1860s and the Michaux "Velocipede", aka "Boneshaker" ===
The first widespread and commercially successful design was French. An example is at the Canada Science and Technology Museum, in Ottawa, Ontario. Initially developed around 1863, it sparked a fashionable craze briefly during 1868–70. Its design was simpler than the Macmillan bicycle; it used rotary cranks and pedals mounted to the front wheel hub. Pedaling made it easier for riders to propel the machine at speed, but the rotational speed limitation of this design created stability and comfort concerns which would lead to the large front wheel of the "penny farthing". It was difficult to pedal the wheel that was used for steering. The use of metal frames reduced the weight and provided sleeker, more elegant designs, and also allowed mass-production. Different braking mechanisms were used depending on the manufacturer. In England, the velocipede earned the name of "bone-shaker" because of its rigid frame and iron-banded wheels that resulted in a "bone-shaking experience for riders".

The velocipede's renaissance began in Paris during the late 1860s. Its early history is complex and has been shrouded in some mystery, not least because of conflicting patent claims: all that has been stated for sure is that a French metalworker attached pedals to the front wheel; at present, the earliest year bicycle historians agree on is 1864. The identity of the person who attached cranks is still an open question at International Cycling History Conferences (ICHC). The claims of Ernest Michaux and of Pierre Lallement, and the lesser claims of rear-pedaling Alexandre Lefebvre, have their supporters within the ICHC community.

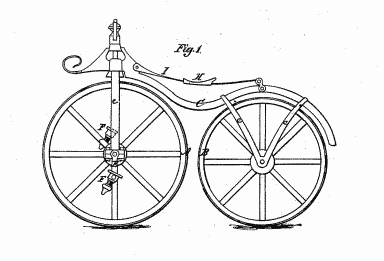
The original pedal-bicycle, with the serpentine frame, from Pierre Lallement's US Patent No. 59,915 drawing, 1866

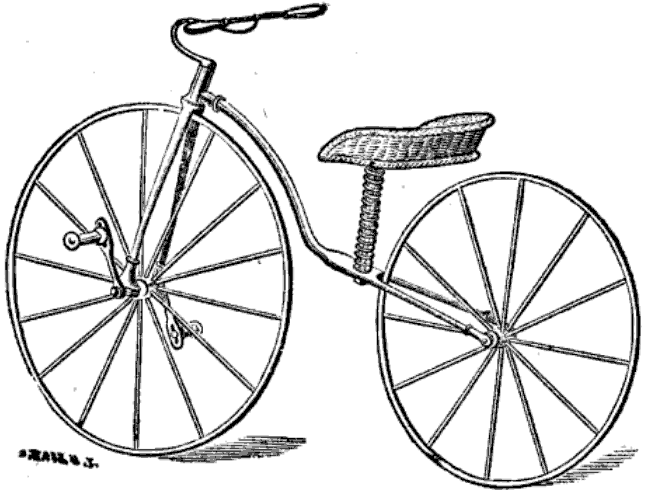
New York company Pickering and Davis invented this pedal-bicycle for ladies in 1869.

Bicycle historian David V. Herlihy documents that Lallement claimed to have created the pedal bicycle in Paris in 1863. He had seen someone riding a draisine in 1862 then originally came up with the idea to add pedals to it. It is a fact that he filed the earliest and only patent for a pedal-driven bicycle in the US in 1866. Lallement's patent drawing shows a machine which looks exactly like Johnson's draisine, but with the pedals and rotary cranks attached to the front wheel hub, and a thin piece of iron over the top of the frame to act as a spring supporting the seat, for a slightly more comfortable ride.

By the early 1860s, the blacksmith Pierre Michaux, besides producing parts for the carriage trade, was producing "vélocipède à pédales" on a small scale. The wealthy Olivier brothers Aimé and René were students in Paris at this time, and these shrewd young entrepreneurs adopted the new machine. In 1865, they travelled from Paris to Avignon on a velocipede in only eight days. They recognized the potential profitability of producing and selling the new machine.

Together with their friend Georges de la Bouglise, they formed a partnership with Pierre Michaux, Michaux et Cie ("Michaux and company"), in 1868, avoiding use of the Olivier family name and staying behind the scenes, lest the venture prove to be a failure. This was the first company which mass-produced bicycles, replacing the early wooden frame with one made of two pieces of cast iron bolted together—otherwise, the early Michaux machines look exactly like Lallement's patent drawing. Together with a mechanic named Gabert in his hometown of Lyon, Aimé Olivier created a diagonal single-piece frame made of wrought iron which was much stronger, and as the first bicycle craze took hold, many other blacksmiths began forming companies to make bicycles using the new design. Velocipedes were expensive, and when customers soon began to complain about the Michaux serpentine cast-iron frames breaking, the Oliviers realized by 1868 that they needed to replace that design with the diagonal one which their competitors were already using, and the Michaux company continued to dominate the industry in its first years.

On the new macadam paved boulevards of Paris it was easy riding, although initially still using what was essentially horse coach technology. It was still called "velocipede" in France, but in the United States, the machine was commonly called the "bone-shaker". Later improvements included solid rubber tires and ball bearings. Lallement had left Paris in July 1865, crossed the Atlantic, settled in Connecticut and patented the velocipede, and the number of associated inventions and patents soared in the US. The popularity of the machine grew on both sides of the Atlantic and by 1868–69 the velocipede craze was strong in rural areas as well. Even in a relatively small city such as Halifax, Nova Scotia, Canada, there were five velocipede rinks, and riding schools began opening in many major urban centers. Essentially, the velocipede was a stepping stone that created a market for bicycles that led to the development of more advanced and efficient machines.

In 1869, William Van Anden of Poughkeepsie, New York, USA, invented the freewheel for the bicycle. His design placed a ratchet device in the hub of the front wheel (the driven wheel on the 'velocipede' designs of the time), which allowed the rider to propel himself forward without pedaling constantly. Initially, bicycle enthusiasts rejected the idea of a freewheel because they believed it would complicate the mechanical functions of the bicycle. Bicycle enthusiasts believed that the bicycle was supposed to remain as simple as possible without any additional mechanisms, such as the freewheel.

=== 1870s: the high-wheel bicycle ===
The high-bicycle was the logical extension of the boneshaker, the front wheel enlarging to enable higher speeds (limited by the inside leg measurement of the rider), the rear wheel shrinking and the frame being made lighter. Frenchman Eugène Meyer is now regarded as the father of the high bicycle by the ICHC in place of James Starley. Meyer invented the wire-spoke tension wheel in 1869 and produced a classic high bicycle design until the 1880s.

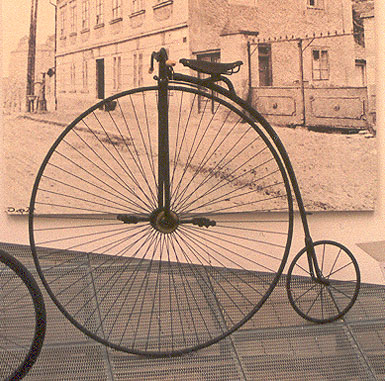
A penny-farthing or ordinary bicycle photographed in the Škoda museum in the Czech Republic

James Starley in Coventry added the tangent spokes and the mounting step to his famous bicycle named "Ariel". He is regarded as the father of the British cycling industry. Ball bearings, solid rubber tires and hollow-section steel frames became standard, reducing weight and making the ride much smoother. Depending on the rider's leg length, the front wheel could now have a diameter up to 60 in (1.5 m).

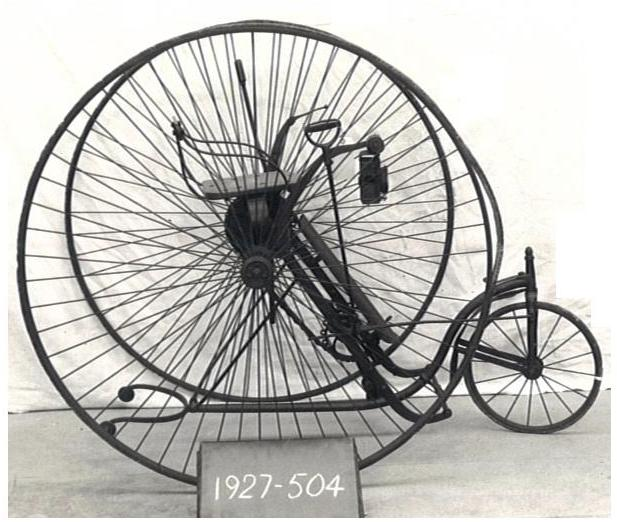
Starley's "Royal Salvo" tricycle, as owned by Queen Victoria

Much later, when this type of bicycle was beginning to be replaced by a later design, it came to be referred to as the "ordinary bicycle". (While it was in common use no such distinguishing adjective was used, since there was then no other kind.) and was later nicknamed "penny-farthing" in England (a penny representing the front wheel, and a coin smaller in size and value, the farthing, representing the rear). They were fast, but unsafe. The rider was high up in the air and traveling at a great speed. If he hit a bad spot in the road he could easily be thrown over the front wheel and be seriously injured (two broken wrists were common, in attempts to break a fall) or even killed. "Taking a header" (also known as "coming a cropper"), was not at all uncommon.

The rider's legs were often caught underneath the handlebars, so falling free of the machine was often not possible. The dangerous nature of these bicycles (as well as Victorian mores) made cycling the preserve of adventurous young men. The risk averse, such as elderly gentlemen, preferred the more stable tricycles or quadracycles. In addition, women's fashion of the day made the "ordinary" bicycle inaccessible. Queen Victoria owned Starley's "Royal Salvo" tricycle, though there is no evidence she actually rode it.

Although French and English inventors modified the velocipede into the high-wheel bicycle, the French were still recovering from the Franco-Prussian War, so English entrepreneurs put the high-wheeler on the English market, and the machine became very popular there, Coventry, Oxford, Birmingham and Manchester being the centers of the English bicycle industry (and of the arms or sewing machine industries, which had the necessary metalworking and engineering skills for bicycle manufacturing, as in Paris and St. Etienne, and in New England). Soon bicycles found their way across the English Channel. By 1875, high-wheel bicycles were becoming popular in France, though ridership expanded slowly.

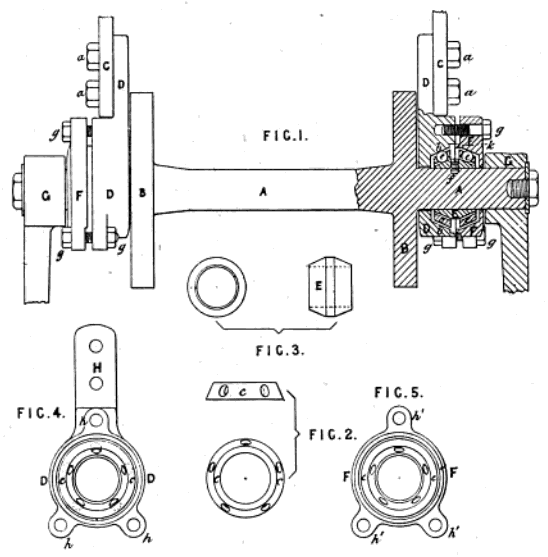
Ball bearings in bikes - Hughes 1877

In 1877, Joseph Henry Hughes' provisional patent application was allowed, titled "Improvements in the bearings of bicycles and velocipedes or carriages". Hughes, a local of Birmingham, described a ball bearing race for bicycle and carriage wheels which allowed for initial adjustment of the system to ensure optimal contacts between components, and for subsequent adjustments to compensate for wear of components from use. William Bown, an already successful owner of Bown Manufacturing Company, persuaded Hughes to sell rights to this patent to him. Having patented improvements to sewing machines and horse clippers himself, Bown also persuaded Hughes join him on further bearing innovations for the next decade. This turned into the successful Aeolus brand of ball bearings, used in the first ball-race-pedals and wheel-bearings for bicycles and carriage wheels.

In the United States, Bostonians such as Frank Weston started importing bicycles in 1877 and 1878, and Albert Augustus Pope started production of his "Columbia" high-wheelers in 1878, and gained control of nearly all applicable patents, starting with Lallement's 1866 patent. Pope lowered the royalty (licensing fee) previous patent owners charged, and took his competitors to court over the patents. The courts supported him, and competitors either paid royalties ($10 per bicycle), or he forced them out of business. There seems to have been no patent issue in France, where English bicycles still dominated the market. In 1880, G.W. Pressey invented the high-wheeler American Star Bicycle, whose smaller front wheel was designed to decrease the frequency of "headers". By 1884 high-wheelers and tricycles were relatively popular among a small group of upper-middle-class people in all three countries, the largest group being in England. Their use also spread to the rest of the world, chiefly because of the extent of the British Empire.

Pope also introduced mechanization and mass production (later copied and adopted by Ford and General Motors), vertically integrated, (also later copied and adopted by Ford), advertised aggressively (as much as ten percent of all advertising in U.S. periodicals in 1898 was by bicycle makers), promoted the Good Roads Movement (which had the side benefit of acting as advertising, and of improving sales by providing more places to ride), and litigated on behalf of cyclists (It would, however, be Western Wheel Works of Chicago which would drastically reduce production costs by introducing stamping to the production process in place of machining, significantly reducing costs, and thus prices.) In addition, bicycle makers adopted the annual model change (later derided as planned obsolescence, and usually credited to General Motors), which proved very successful.

Even so, bicycling remained the province of the urban well-to-do, and mainly men, until the 1890s, and was an example of conspicuous consumption.

=== The safety bicycle and the bike bubble: 1880s and 1890s ===
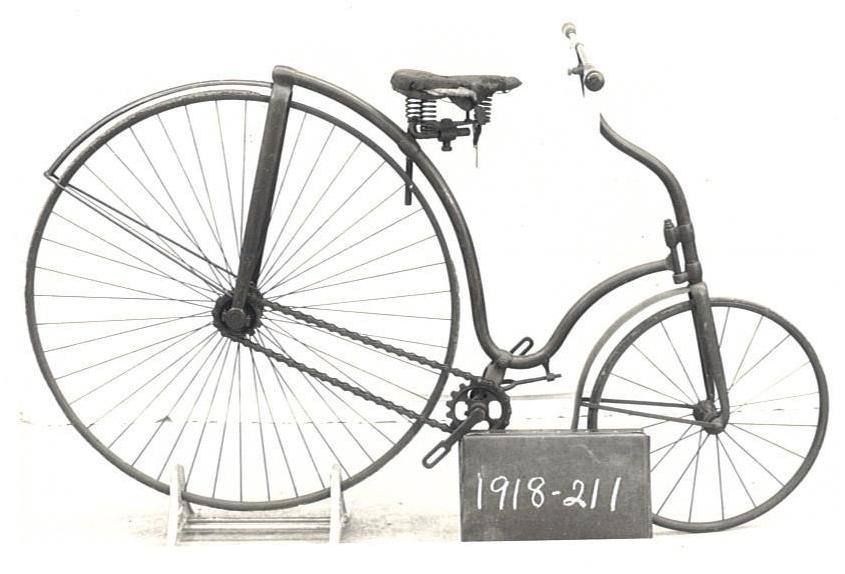
An 1884 McCammon safety bicycle

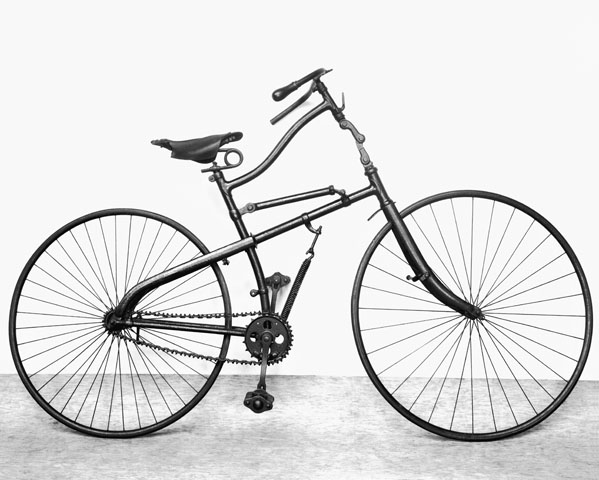
An 1885 Whippet safety bicycle

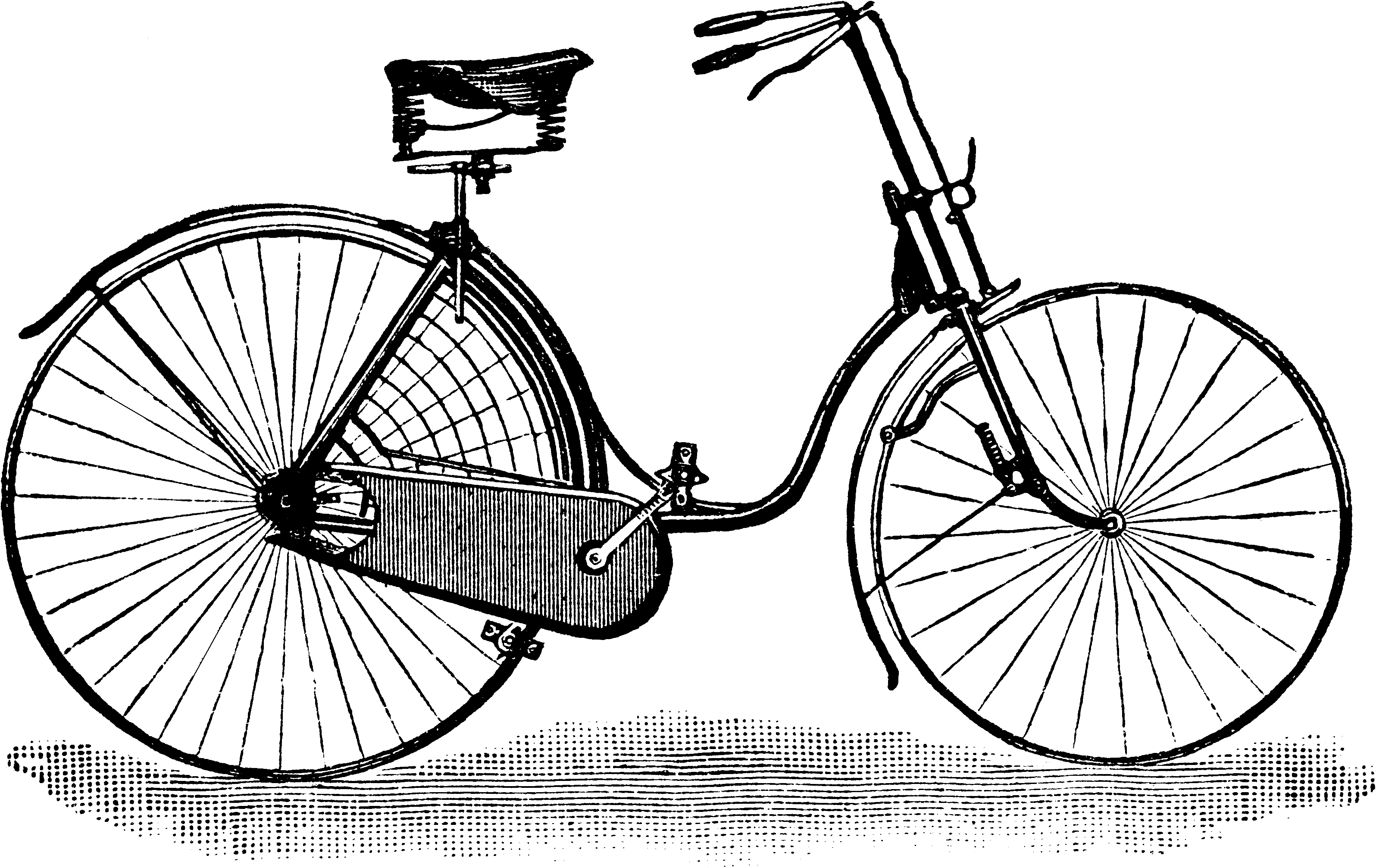
An 1889 Lady's safety bicycle

The development of the safety bicycle was arguably the most important change in the history of the bicycle. It shifted their use and public perception from being a dangerous toy for sporting young men to being an everyday transport tool for men and women of all ages.

Aside from the obvious safety problems, the high-wheeler's direct front wheel drive limited its top speed. One attempt to solve both problems with a chain-driven front wheel was the dwarf bicycle, exemplified by the Kangaroo. Inventors also tried a rear wheel chain drive. Although Harry John Lawson invented a rear-chain-drive bicycle in 1879 with his "bicyclette", it still had a huge front wheel and a small rear wheel. Detractors called it "The Crocodile", and it failed in the market.

John Kemp Starley, James Starley's nephew, produced the first successful "safety bicycle", the "Rover", in 1885, which he never patented. It featured a steerable front wheel that had significant caster, equally sized wheels and a chain drive to the rear wheel.

Widely imitated, the safety bicycle completely replaced the high-wheeler in North America and Western Europe by 1890. Meanwhile, John Dunlop's reinvention of the pneumatic bicycle tire in 1888 had made for a much smoother ride on paved streets; the previous type were quite smooth-riding, when used on the dirt roads common at the time. As with the original velocipede, safety bicycles had been much less comfortable than high-wheelers precisely because of the smaller wheel size, and frames were often buttressed with complicated bicycle suspension spring assemblies. The pneumatic tire made all of these obsolete, and frame designers found a diamond pattern to be the strongest and most efficient design.

On 10 October 1899, Isaac R Johnson, an African-American inventor, lodged his patent for a folding bicycle – the first with a recognisably modern diamond frame, the pattern still used in 21st-century bicycles.

The chain drive improved comfort and speed, as the drive was transferred to the non-steering rear wheel and allowed for smooth, relaxed and injury free pedaling (earlier designs that required pedalling the steering front wheel were difficult to pedal while turning, due to the misalignment of rotational planes of leg and pedal). With easier pedaling, the rider more easily turned corners.

Most likely the first electric bicycle was built in 1897 by Hosea W. Libbey.

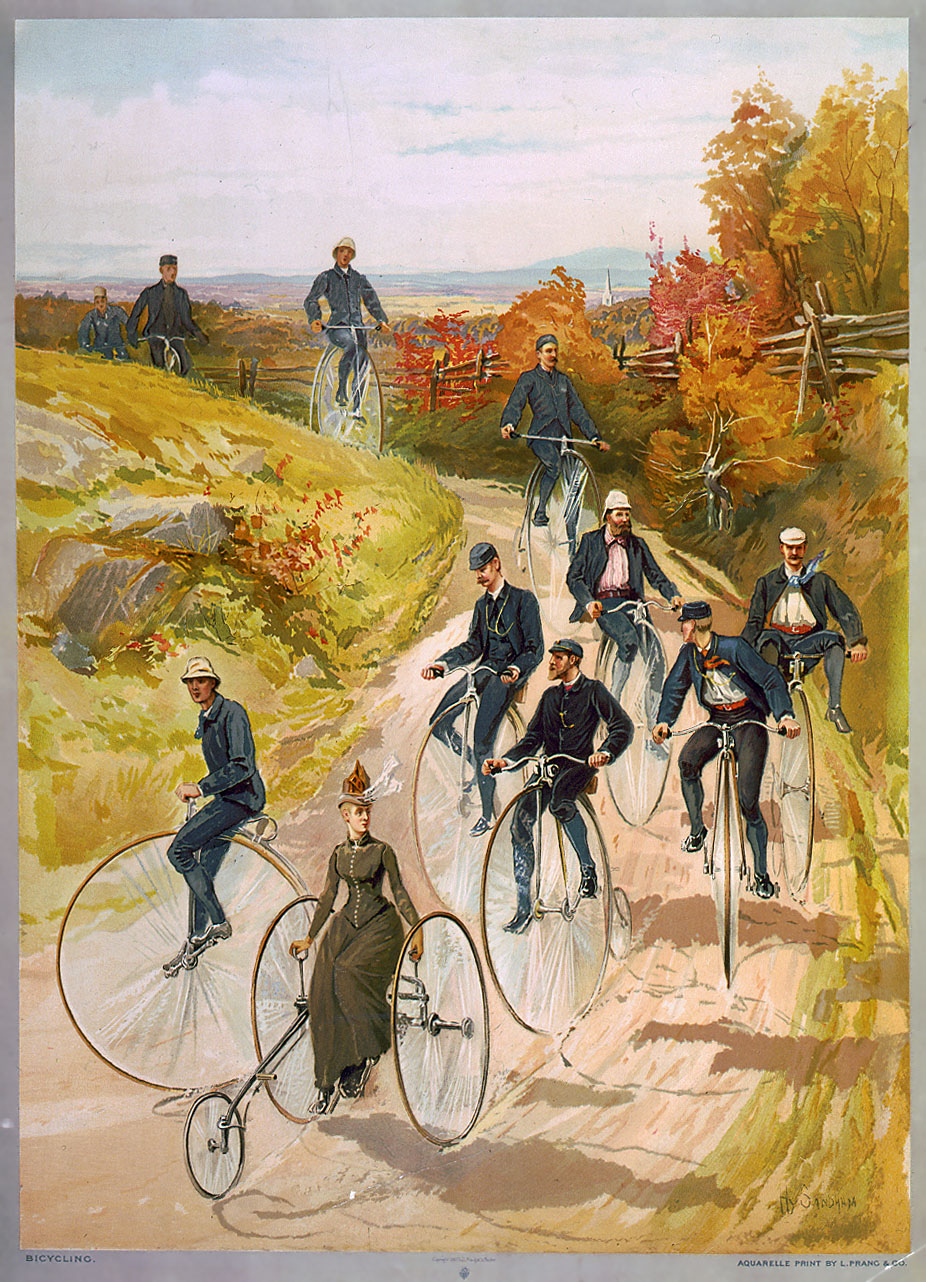
a ca. 1887 color print

In the middle of the decade, bicycle sales were one of the few areas of the economy where sales were growing despite a severe economic depression, leading hundreds of manufacturers to enter business. This resulted in a downward spiral of market saturation, over-supply and intense price competition, eventually leading to the collapse of many manufacturers as the bicycle bubble burst.

== 20th century ==
=== The roadster ===
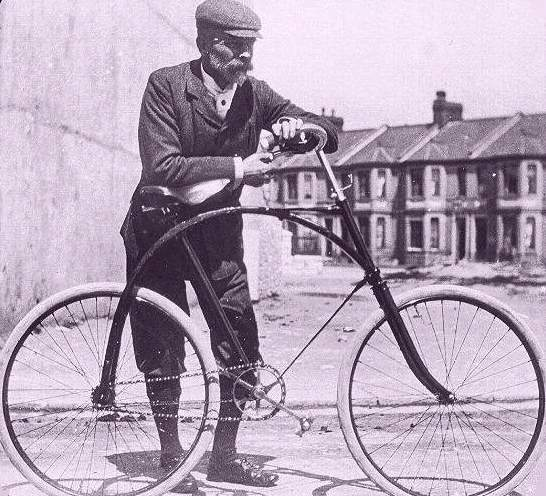
Bicycle in Plymouth, England at the start of the 20th century

The ladies' version of the roadster's design was very much in place by the 1890s. It had a step-through frame rather than the diamond frame of the gentlemen's model so that ladies, with their dresses and skirts, could easily mount and ride their bicycles, and commonly came with a skirt guard to prevent skirts and dresses becoming entangled in the rear wheel and spokes. As with the gents' roadster, the frame was of steel construction and the positioning of the frame and handlebars gave the rider a very upright riding position. Though they originally came with front spoon-brakes, technological advancements meant that later models were equipped with the much-improved coaster brakes or rod-actuated rim or drum-brakes.

The Dutch cycle industry grew rapidly from the 1890s onwards. Since by then it was the British who had the strongest and best-developed market in bike design, Dutch framemakers either copied them or imported them from England. In 1895, 85 percent of all bikes bought in the Netherlands were from Britain; the vestiges of that influence can still be seen in the solid, gentlemanly shape of a traditional Dutch bike even now.

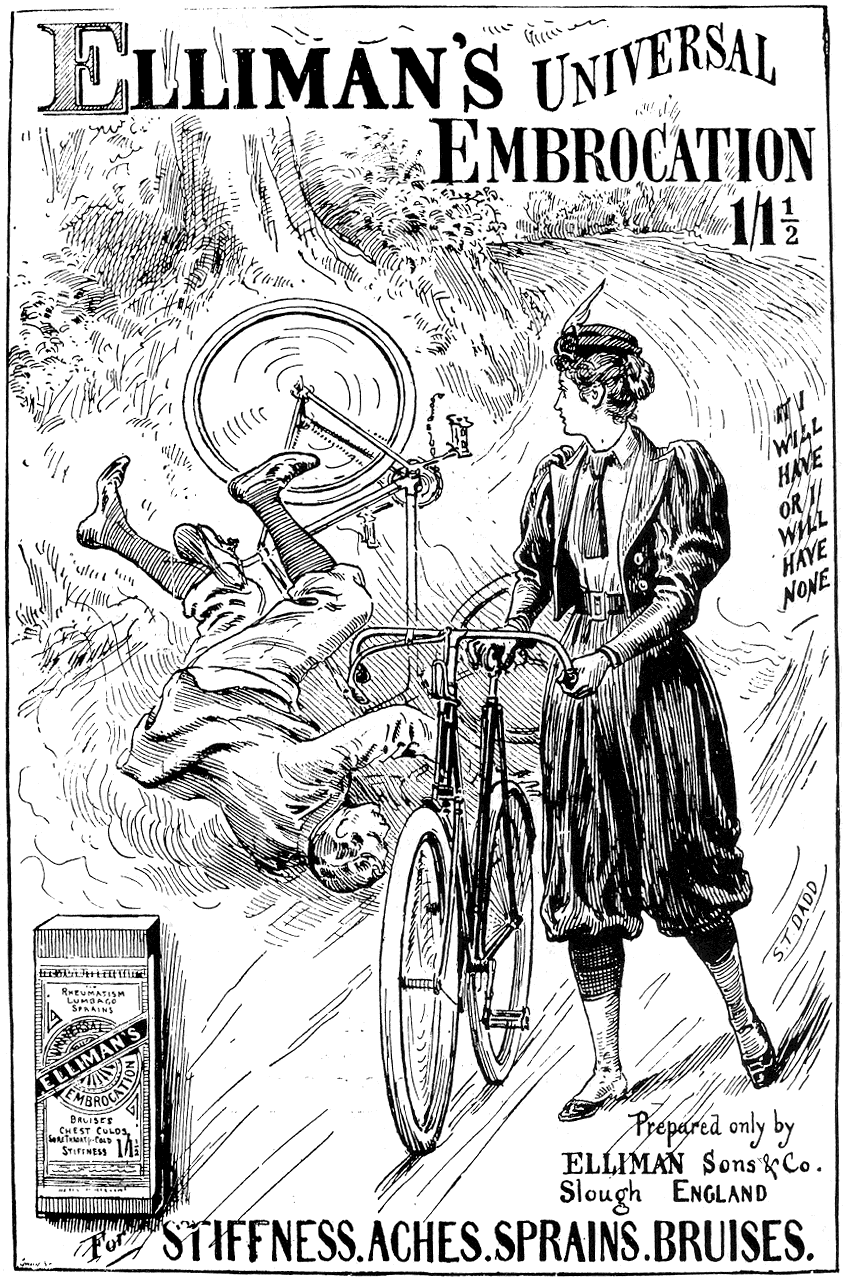
1897

Though the ladies' version of the roadster largely fell out of fashion in England and many other Western nations as the 20th century progressed, it remains popular in the Netherlands; this is why some people refer to bicycles of this design as Dutch bikes. In Dutch the name of these bicycles is Omafiets ("grandma's bike").

=== Popularity in Europe, decline in US ===
Cycling steadily became more important in Europe over the first half of the twentieth century, but it dropped off dramatically in the United States between 1900 and 1910. Automobiles became the preferred means of transportation. Over the 1920s, bicycles gradually became considered children's toys, and by 1940 most bicycles in the United States were made for children. In Europe cycling remained an adult activity, and bicycle racing, commuting, and "cyclotouring" were all popular activities. In addition, specialist bicycles for children appeared before 1916.

From the early 20th century until after World War II, the roadster constituted most adult bicycles sold in the United Kingdom and in many parts of the British Empire. For many years after the advent of the motorcycle and automobile, they remained a primary means of adult transport. Major manufacturers in England were Raleigh and BSA, though Carlton, Phillips, Triumph, Rudge-Whitworth, Hercules, and Elswick Hopper also made them.

=== Technical innovations ===
Bicycles continued to evolve to suit the varied needs of riders. The derailleur developed in France between 1900 and 1910 among cyclotourists, and was improved over time. Only in the 1930s did European racing organizations allow racers to use gearing; until then they were forced to use a two-speed bicycle. The rear wheel had a sprocket on either side of the hub. To change gears, the rider had to stop, remove the wheel, flip it around, and remount the wheel. When racers were allowed to use derailleurs, racing times immediately dropped.

=== World War II ===
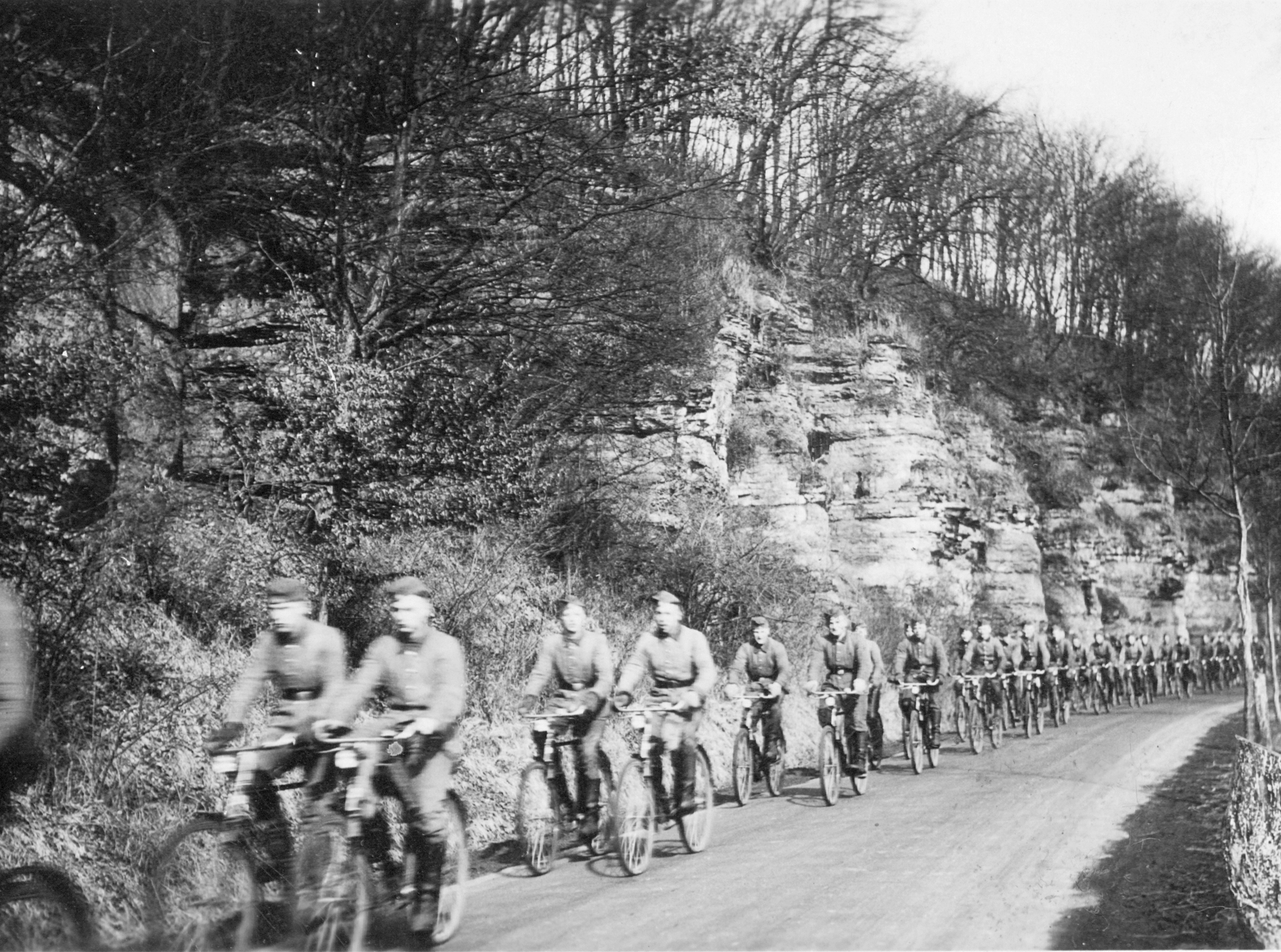
German Wehrmacht bicycle troops.

Although multiple-speed bicycles were widely known by this time, most or all military bicycles used in the Second World War were single-speed. Bicycles were used by paratroopers during the war to help them with transportation, creating the term "bomber bikes" to refer to US planes dropping bikes for troops to use. The German Volksgrenadier units each had a battalion of bicycle infantry attached. The Invasion of Poland saw many bicycle-riding scouts in use, with each bicycle company using 196 bicycles and 1 motorcycle. By September 1939, there were 41 bicycle companies mobilized.

During the Second Sino-Japanese War, Japan used around 50,000 bicycle troops. The Malayan Campaign saw many bicycles used. The Japanese confiscated bicycles from civilians due to the abundance of bicycles among the civilian population. Japanese bicycle troops were efficient in both speed and carrying capacity, as they could carry 36 kilograms (79 lb) of equipment compared to a normal British soldier, who could carry 18 kilograms (40 lb).

=== China and the Flying Pigeon ===
Flying Pigeon (simplified Chinese: 飞鸽; traditional Chinese: 飛鴿; pinyin: fēigē) is a Chinese publicly owned bicycle company based in Tianjin.

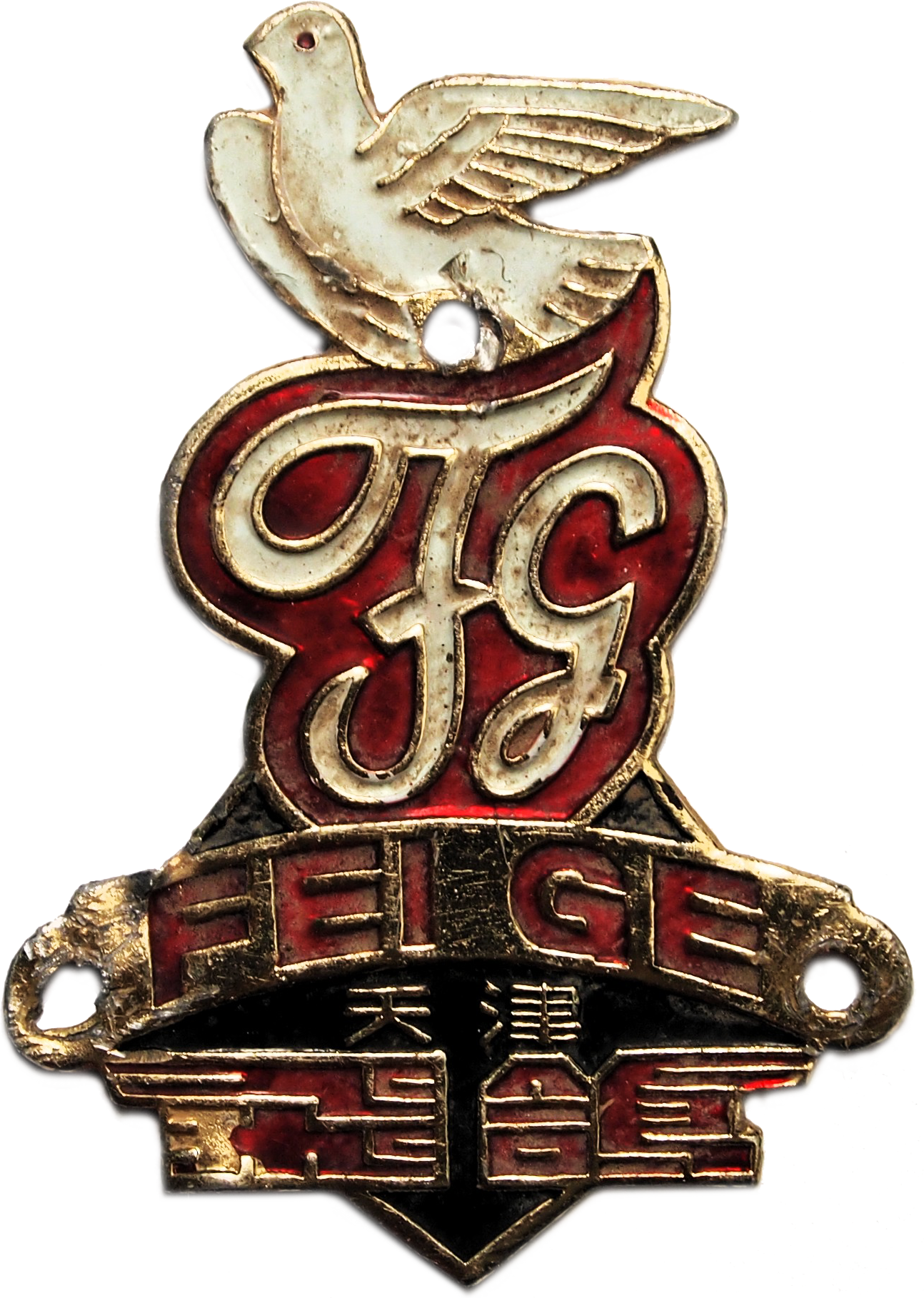
Flying Pigeon's stylized bird head badge.

Since 1950, more than 500 million Flying Pigeon PA-02 bicycles have been made, and as of 2007, more than any other model of vehicle.

=== North America: Cruiser vs. racer ===
At mid-century there were two predominant bicycle styles for recreational cyclists in North America. Heavyweight cruiser bicycles, preferred by the typical (hobby) cyclist, featuring balloon tires, pedal-driven "coaster" brakes and only one gear, were popular for their durability, comfort, streamlined appearance, and a significant array of accessories (lights, bells, springer forks, speedometers, etc.). Lighter cycles, with hand brakes, narrower tires, and a three-speed hub gearing system, often imported from England, first became popular in the United States in the late 1950s. These comfortable, practical bicycles usually offered generator-powered headlamps, safety reflectors, kickstands, and frame-mounted tire pumps. In the United Kingdom, like the rest of Europe, cycling was seen as less of a hobby, and lightweight but durable bikes had been preferred for decades.

In the United States, the sports roadster was imported after World War II, and was known as the "English racer". It quickly became popular with adult cyclists seeking an alternative to the traditional youth-oriented cruiser bicycle. While the English racer was no racing bike, it was faster and better for climbing hills than the cruiser, thanks to its lighter weight, tall wheels, narrow tires, and internally geared rear hubs. In the late 1950s, U.S. manufacturers such as Schwinn began producing their own "lightweight" version of the English racer.

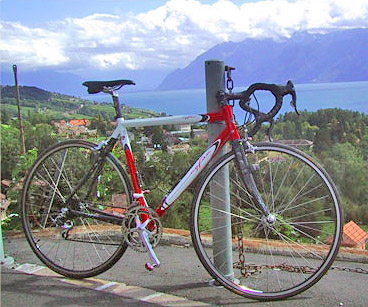
This racing bicycle has aluminum tubing, carbon fiber stays and forks, a drop handlebar, and narrow tires and wheels.

In the late 1960s, Americans' increasing consciousness of the value of exercise and later the advantage of energy efficient transportation led to the American bike boom of the 1970s. Annual U.S. sales of adult bicycles doubled between 1960 and 1970, and doubled again between 1971 and 1975, the peak years of the adult cycling boom in the United States, eventually reaching nearly 17 million units.

Most of these sales were to new cyclists, who overwhelmingly preferred models imitating popular European derailleur-equipped racing bikes—variously called sports models, sport/tourers, or simply ten-speeds—to the older roadsters with hub gears which remained much the same as they had been since the 1930s. These lighter bicycles, long used by serious cyclists and by racers, featured dropped handlebars, narrow tires, derailleur gears, five to fifteen speeds, and a narrow 'racing' type saddle. By 1980, racing and sport/touring derailleur bikes dominated the market in North America. Fatbike was invented for off-road usage in 1980.

=== Europe ===
In Britain, the utility roadster declined noticeably in popularity during the early 1970s, as a boom in recreational cycling caused manufacturers to concentrate on lightweight (10.4–13.6 kg or 23–30 lb), affordable derailleur sport bikes, actually slightly-modified versions of the racing bicycle of the era.

In the early 1980s, Swedish company Itera invented a new type of bicycle, made entirely of plastic. It was a commercial failure.

In the 1980s, UK cyclists began to shift from road-only bicycles to all-terrain models such as the mountain bike. The mountain bike's sturdy frame and load-carrying ability gave it additional versatility as a utility bike, usurping the role previously filled by the roadster. By 1990, the roadster was almost dead; while annual UK bicycle sales reached an all-time record of 2.8 million, almost all of them were mountain and road/sport models.

=== BMX bikes ===
BMX bikes are specially designed bicycles that usually have 16 to 24-inch wheels (the norm being the 20-inch wheel), which originated in the state of California in the early 1970s when teenagers imitated their motocross heroes on their bicycles. Children were racing standard road bikes off-road, around purpose-built tracks in the Netherlands. The 1971 motorcycle racing documentary On Any Sunday is generally credited with inspiring the movement nationally in the US. In the opening scene, kids are shown riding their Schwinn Sting-Rays off-road. It was not until the middle of the decade the sport achieved critical mass, and manufacturers began creating bicycles designed specially for the sport.

It has grown into an international sport with several different disciplines such as Freestyle, Racing, Street, and Flatland.

=== Mountain bikes ===
In 1981, the first mass-produced mountain bike appeared, intended for use off-pavement over a variety of surfaces. It was an immediate success, and sold well during the 1980s, their popularity spurred by the novelty of all-terrain cycling and the increasing desire of urban dwellers to escape their surroundings via mountain biking and other extreme sports. These cycles featured sturdier frames, wider tires with large knobs for increased traction, a more upright seating position (to allow better visibility and shifting of body weight), and increasingly, various front and rear suspension designs.

== 21st century ==
The 21st century has seen a continued application of technology to bicycles (which started in the 20th century): in designing them, building them, and using them. Bicycle frames and components continue to get lighter and more aerodynamic without sacrificing strength largely through the use of computer aided design, finite element analysis, and computational fluid dynamics. Recent discoveries about bicycle stability have been facilitated by computer simulations. Once designed, new technology is applied to manufacturing such as hydroforming and automated carbon fiber layup. Finally, electronic gadgetry has expanded from just cyclocomputers to now include cycling power meters and electronic gear-shifting systems.

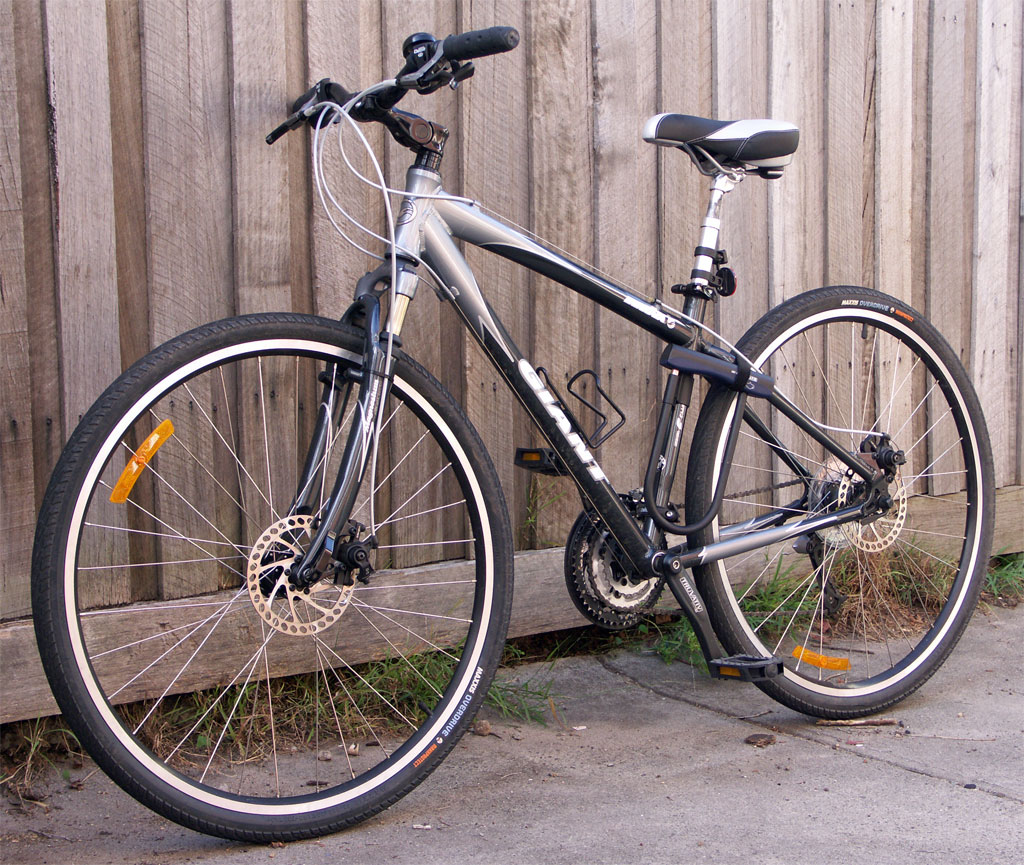
The 2005 Giant Innova is an example of a typical 700C hybrid bicycle. It has 27 speeds, front fork and seat suspension, an adjustable stem and disc brakes for wet-weather riding.

=== Hybrid and commuter bicycles ===
In recent years, bicycle designs have trended towards increased specialization, as the number of casual, recreational and commuter cyclists has grown. For these groups, the industry responded with the hybrid bicycle, sometimes marketed as a city bike, cross bike, or commuter bike. Hybrid bicycles combine elements of road racing and mountain bikes, though the term is applied to a wide variety of bicycle types.

Hybrid bicycles and commuter bicycles can range from fast and light racing-type bicycles with flat bars and other minimal concessions to casual use, to wider-tired bikes designed for primarily for comfort, load-carrying, and increased versatility over a range of different road surfaces. Enclosed hub gears have become popular again – now with up to 8, 11 or 14 gears – for such bicycles due to ease of maintenance and improved technology.

=== Recumbent bicycle ===
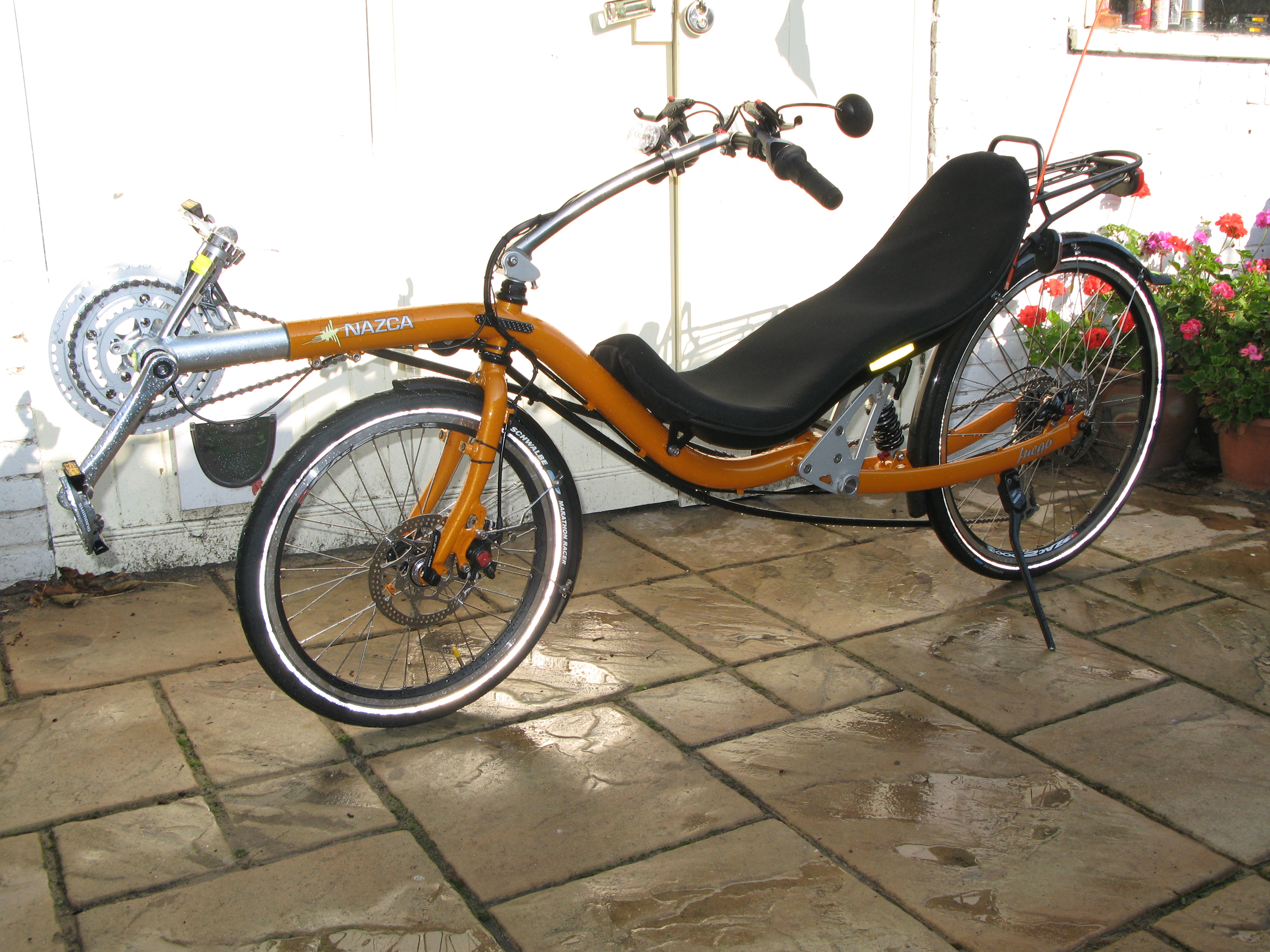
2008 Nazca Fuego short wheelbase recumbent with 20″ front wheel and 26″ rear wheel

The recumbent bicycle was invented in 1893. In 1934, the Union Cycliste Internationale banned recumbent bicycles from all forms of officially sanctioned racing, at the behest of the conventional bicycle industry, after relatively little-known Francis Faure beat world champion Henri Lemoine and broke Oscar Egg's hour record by half a mile while riding Mochet's Velocar. Some authors assert that this resulted in the stagnation of the upright racing bike's frame geometry which has remained essentially unchanged for 70 years. This stagnation finally started to reverse with the formation of the International Human Powered Vehicle Association which holds races for "banned" classes of bicycle. Sam Whittingham set a human powered speed record of 132 km/h (82 mph) on level ground in a faired recumbent streamliner in 2009 at Battle Mountain.

While historically most bike frames have been steel, recent designs, particularly of high-end racing bikes, have made extensive use of carbon and aluminum frames. In addition to influences derived from the evolution of American bicycling trends, European, Asian and African cyclists have also continued to use traditional roadster bicycles, as their rugged design, enclosed chainguards, and dependable hub gearing make them ideal for commuting and utility cycling duty.

== See also ==
- Bicycling and feminism
- Bike boom, also known as "bicycle craze", a name used for several periods in cycling history
- Cyclability
- Hour record
- Timeline of transportation technology
- Electric bicycle

== Bibliography ==
- Herlihy, David V. (2004). Bicycle: The History. New Haven: Yale University Press. ISBN 9780300120479.
- Norcliffe, Glen (2001). The Ride to Modernity: The Bicycle in Canada, 1869–1900. Toronto, Ontario: University of Toronto Press. ISBN 978-0-8020-8205-3.
