= Thomas McCall (inventor) =

Scottish cartwright (1834–1904)

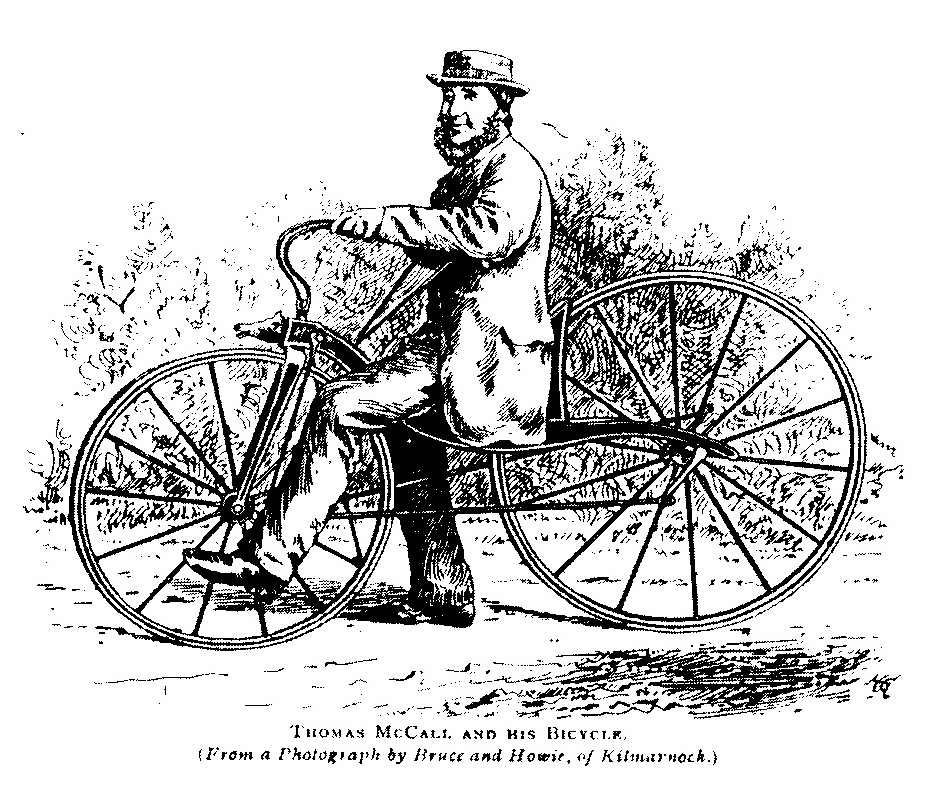
Thomas McCall in 1869 on his velocipede (from Bicycling News 2/6/1892)

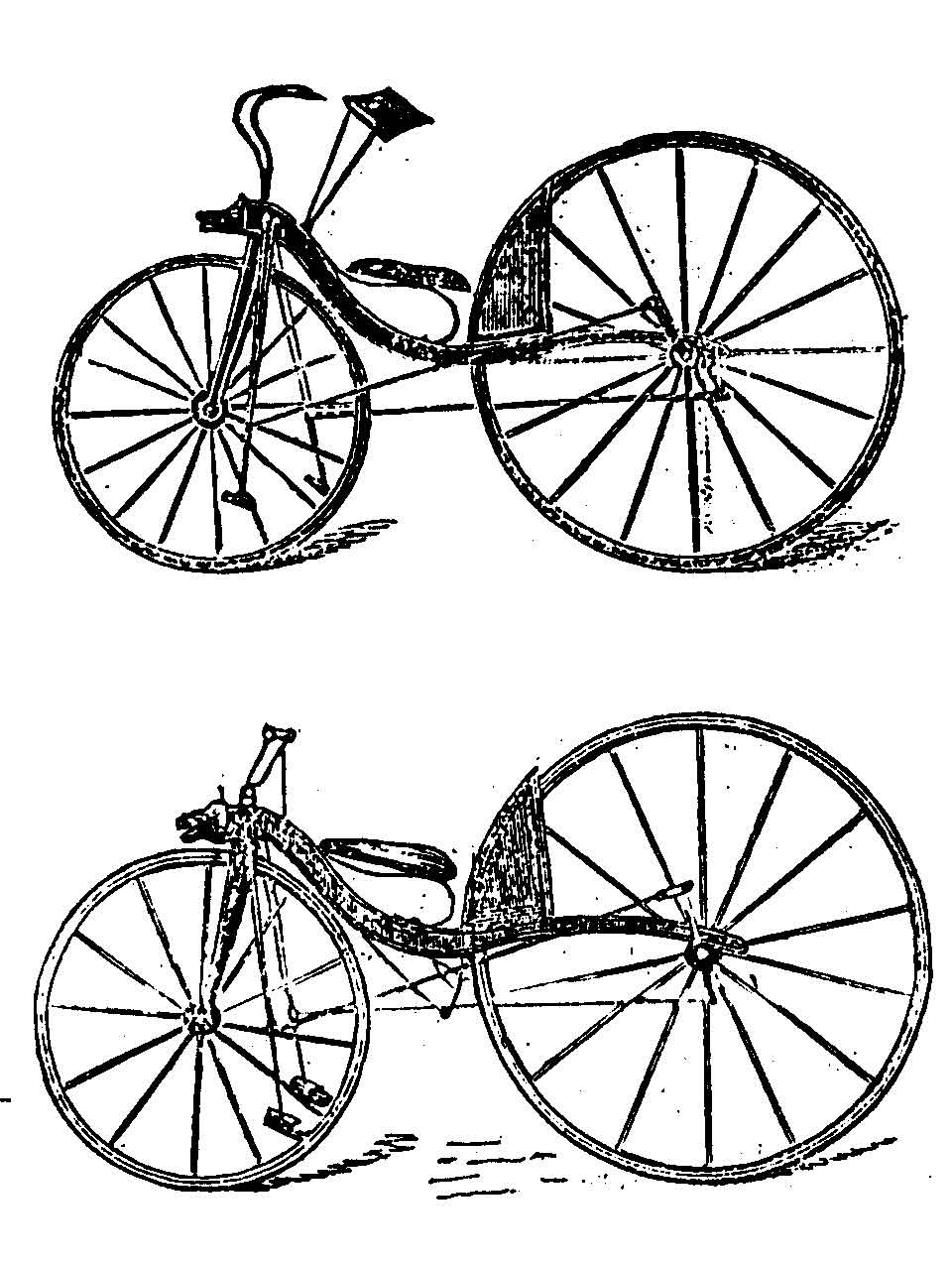
McCall's first (top) and improved velocipede of 1869 - later predated to 1839 and attributed to MacMillan

Thomas McCall (1834–1904) was a Scottish cartwright.

== Biography ==
McCall was born in Penpont, he came to Kilmarnock at age 20, where he lived until his death (obituary 1904).

He built, in 1869, two versions of a two-wheeled velocipede with levers and rods tossing a crank on the rear wheel (English Mechanic 5/14/1869 and 6/11/1869). This was a reaction to the French velocipedes, of the mid-1860s, with their front-wheel pedal cranks. In fact, this rear-wheel idea occupied seven more inventors in that year (Lessing 1991).

When in the 1880s a rich corn-trader named James Johnston started a campaign to attribute the "first true" bicycle to his uncle Kirkpatrick MacMillan and his native country of Dumfries in general, he attributed the McCall designs to MacMillan and dated them as of 1839. Skeptics allege that the reason McCall built a replica of his machines to be exhibited as MacMillan's at the 1896 Stanley Show, at the behest of Johnston, can only be a need of money (Clayton 1987). That alleged replica is now at Dumfries Observatory.

== See also ==
- History of the bicycle
- Treadle bicycle
