= Keir, Dumfries and Galloway =

Village in Dumfries and Galloway, Scotland

Coordinates: 55.219°N 3.795°W

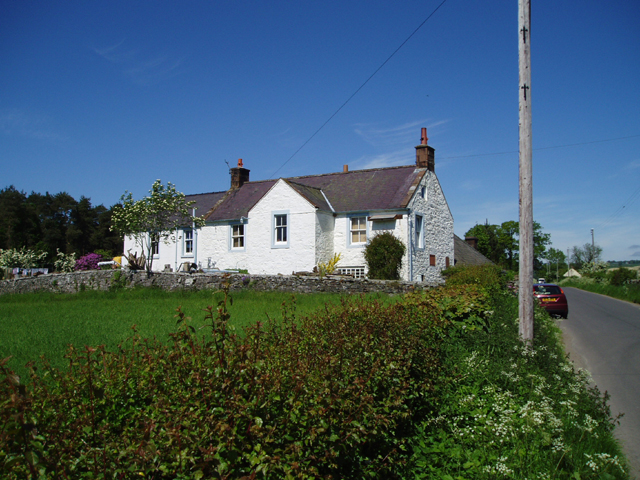
Courthill Smithy

Keir is a civil parish, containing the small village of Keir Mill, in Dumfries and Galloway, Scotland, one mile south of Penpont. It was founded in the late eighteenth century.

== Overview ==
The village was the birthplace of Kirkpatrick Macmillan, the inventor of the bicycle. A plaque on his home, Courthill Smithy, commemorates this. He is buried in the parish church.

The church itself is in the Gothic style, of Capenoch ashlar, and was built from 1813 to 1815 by architect William Burn. In 1880 a vestry was added by James Barbour.

The other notable building in the village is the Mill, built in 1771.

== See also ==
- List of listed buildings in Keir, Dumfries and Galloway
