= List of listed buildings in Keir, Dumfries and Galloway =

This is a list of listed buildings in the parish of Keir in Dumfries and Galloway, Scotland.

== List ==
Name	Location	Date Listed	Grid Ref. (Note: Sometimes known as OSGB36, the grid reference (where provided) is based on the British national grid reference system used by the Ordnance Survey. • "Guide to National Grid". Ordnance Survey. • "Get-a-map". Ordnance Survey.)	Geo-coordinates	Notes	LB Number (Note: Historic Environment Scotland assign a unique alphanumeric identifier to each designated site in Scotland, for listed buildings this always begins with "LB", for example "LB12345".)	Image
Porterstown Farmhouse				55°12′12″N 3°46′31″W	Category B	10214	Upload Photo
Scaur Bridge (Penpont - Kiermill Road Over Scaur Water)				55°13′47″N 3°48′40″W	Category B	10215	Upload Photo
Barjarg House Sundial				55°11′30″N 3°45′51″W	Category B	10224	Upload Photo
Barjarg House Walled Garden				55°11′26″N 3°45′56″W	Category B	10225	Upload Photo
Keirmill Village Keir Parish Church And Churchyard				55°13′12″N 3°47′39″W	Category B	10255	Upload Photo
Barjarg House				55°11′31″N 3°45′51″W	Category B	10220	Upload Photo
Barjarg House, Drybridge				55°11′30″N 3°45′39″W	Category B	10221	Upload Photo
Keirmill Village Former School And Schoolhouse				55°13′09″N 3°47′42″W	Category B	10227	Upload Photo
Barndennoch				55°10′39″N 3°44′29″W	Category B	10242	Upload Photo
Blackwood House Lodge				55°09′37″N 3°42′51″W	Category B	10245	Upload Photo
Keir Bridge (Keirmill/Virginhall Road Over Scaur Water)				55°13′16″N 3°47′24″W	Category C(S)	10252	Upload Photo
Barjarg House Back Lodge				55°11′25″N 3°45′22″W	Category B	10223	Upload Photo
Capenoch House Former Stables				55°13′27″N 3°49′05″W	Category B	10249	Upload Photo
Keirmill Village Keir Parish Old Graveyard				55°13′10″N 3°47′21″W	Category B	10256	Upload Photo
Windsover Cottages				55°09′22″N 3°43′15″W	Category B	10216	Upload Photo
Capenoch House Bridge (Over Shinnel Water, On North Drive)				55°13′41″N 3°49′29″W	Category B	10248	Upload Photo
Capenoch House Sundial				55°13′30″N 3°49′13″W	Category C(S)	10250	Upload Photo
Keirmill Village Church Crescent Cottages At Churchyard Main Gate				55°13′11″N 3°47′38″W	Category C(S)	10253	Upload Photo
Keirmill Village Church Crescent Session House				55°13′10″N 3°47′38″W	Category C(S)	10254	Upload Photo
Keirmill Village Old Manse And Gatepiers				55°13′12″N 3°47′27″W	Category C(S)	10257	Upload Photo
Blackwood House Walled Gardens, Glasshouse And Folly				55°09′59″N 3°42′55″W	Category B	10246	Upload Photo
Courthill Smithy				55°13′20″N 3°48′01″W	Category B	10251	Upload Photo
Blackwood House				55°09′56″N 3°43′01″W	Category B	10243	Upload Photo
Penfillan Mains Farmhouse				55°13′07″N 3°48′08″W	Category B	10213	Upload Photo
Barjarg House Front Lodge And Gateway				55°11′26″N 3°45′48″W	Category B	10222	Upload Photo
Barjarg Limekilns				55°11′38″N 3°45′14″W	Category B	10226	Upload Photo
Blackwood House Former Stables				55°09′55″N 3°43′03″W	Category A	10244	Upload Photo
Capenoch House				55°13′30″N 3°49′11″W	Category A	10247	Upload Photo

== Key ==
The scheme for classifying buildings in Scotland is:

- Category A: "buildings of national or international importance, either architectural or historic; or fine, little-altered examples of some particular period, style or building type."
- Category B: "buildings of regional or more than local importance; or major examples of some particular period, style or building type, which may have been altered."
- Category C: "buildings of local importance; lesser examples of any period, style, or building type, as originally constructed or moderately altered; and simple traditional buildings which group well with other listed buildings."

In March 2016 there were 47,288 listed buildings in Scotland. Of these, 8% were Category A, and 50% were Category B, with the remaining 42% being Category C.
