= Kirkpatrick Macmillan =

Scottish blacksmith and inventor

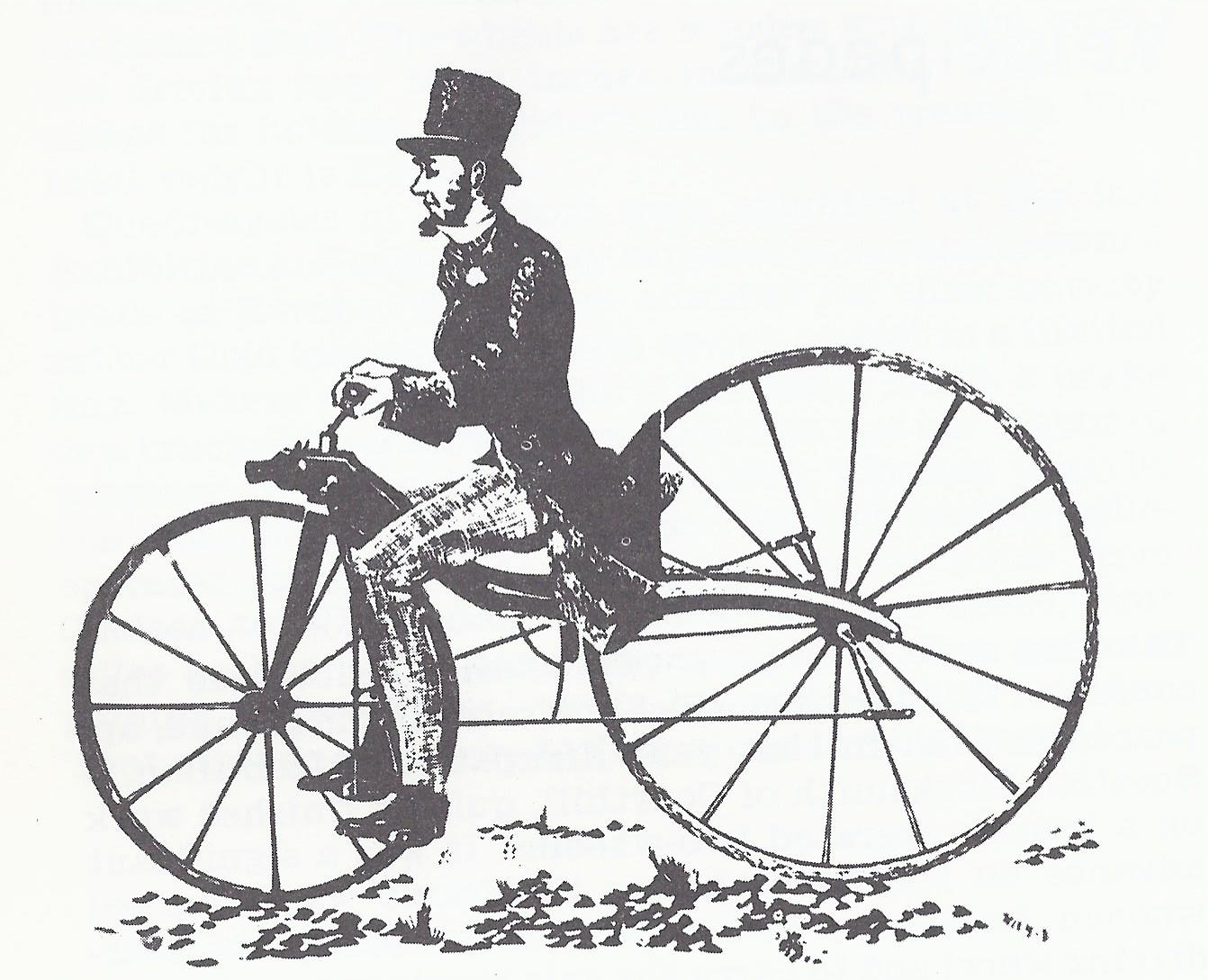
Macmillan 1839

Kirkpatrick Macmillan (2 September 1812 in Keir, Dumfries and Galloway – 26 January 1878 in Keir) was a Scottish blacksmith. Though there is no direct, corroborating evidence, he is generally credited with inventing the treadle bicycle.

== Invention of the first pedal driven bicycle ==
According to the research of his relative James Johnston in the 1890s, Macmillan was the first to invent the pedal-driven bicycle. However, he didn't invent the modern bicycle pedals but rather adapted the treadle, known since the Middle Ages, to the draisine. Johnston, a corn trader and tricyclist, had the firm aim, in his own words "to prove that to my native country of Dumfries belongs the honour of being the birthplace of the invention of the bicycle".

Macmillan allegedly completed construction of a pedal driven bicycle of wood in 1839 that included iron-rimmed wooden wheels, a steerable wheel in the front and a larger wheel in the rear which was connected to pedals via connecting rods.

A Glasgow newspaper reported in 1842 an accident in which an anonymous "gentleman from Dumfries-shire... bestride a velocipede... of ingenious design" knocked over a pedestrian in the Gorbals and was fined five British shillings. Johnston identified Macmillan as that gentleman.

A 1939 plaque on the family smithy in Courthill reads "He builded better than he knew." Yet MacMillan lived in Glasgow and worked at the Vulcan Foundry during the relevant period around 1840, not in Courthill.

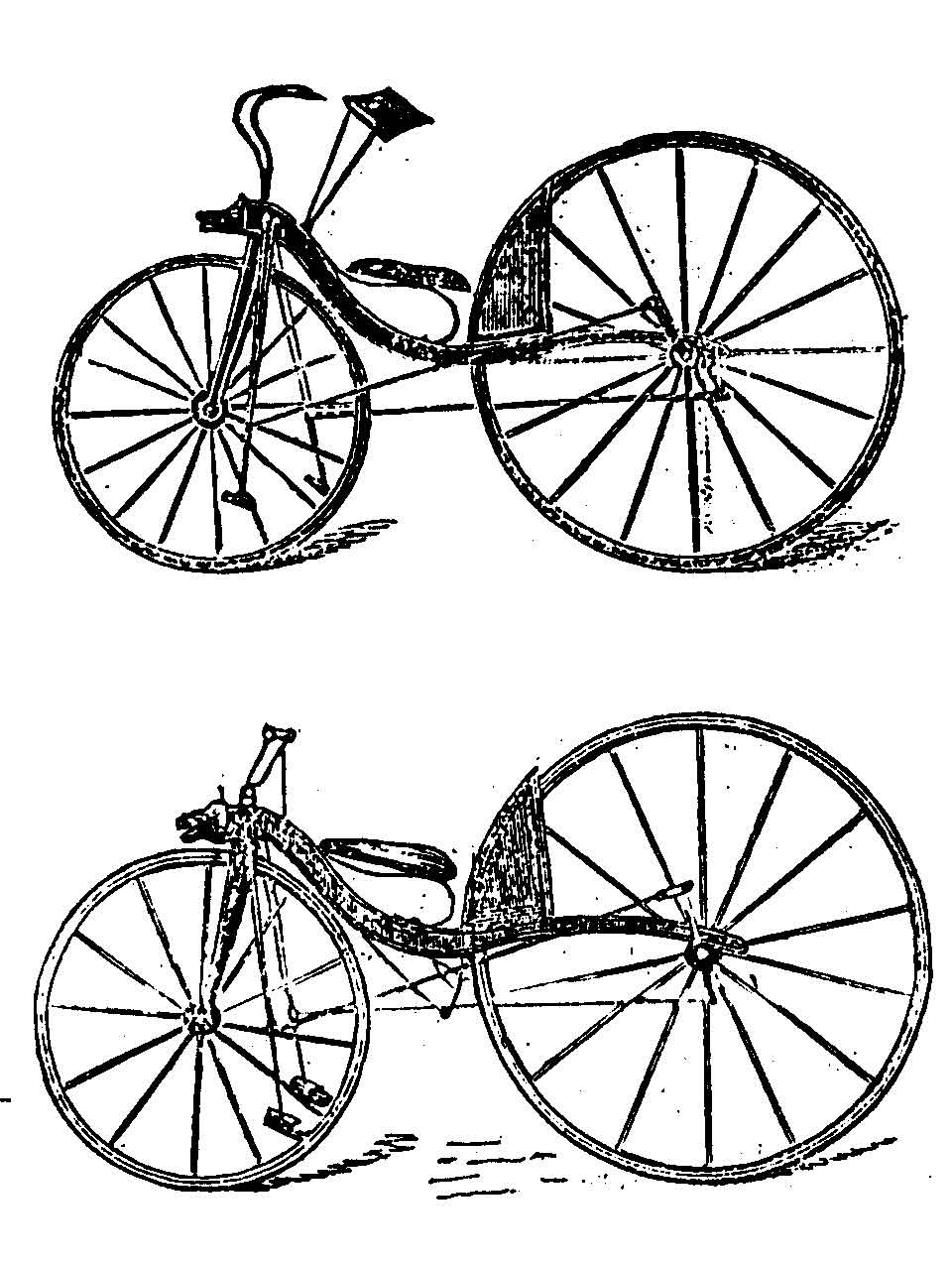
Thomas McCall's first (top) and improved velocipede from The English Mechanic of 1869 – the first rear-wheel pedalled bicycle according to some historians

=== Scepticism ===
The Johnston doctrine of the bright, modest and industrious tradesman, achieving what others would only do decades later, captured the public imagination, especially in Scotland. It was also well accepted among historians, at least British ones, in the early 20th century.

Johnston did not present conclusive proofs, though he wrote that he had them. Sceptics allege that the MacMillan design which he presented was a composite of two 1869 velocipedes by Thomas McCall. At the behest of Johnston, Thomas McCall built a replica to be presented as MacMillan's at the 1896 Stanley show (and now at Dumfries Museum) perhaps for financial reasons.

The identification of MacMillan as recipient of an early speeding ticket for his bicycling is doubted by Alastair Dodds on grounds that its application would require an early Victorian newspaper to call a blacksmith a "gentleman". However, that fails to explain what the velocipede of ingenious design was. Misgivings did not deter popular retelling with interesting details from sources unknown, including the detail that, after the accident, his niece, Mary Marchbank, had an illicit ride on the machine, thereby becoming the first female cyclist.

However, it is said that Gavin Dalzell of Lesmahagow copied the Macmillan machine in 1846 and passed on the details to so many people that for more than 50 years he was generally regarded as the inventor of the bicycle.

=== Other claims to invention ===
Some historians who have studied the invention of the pedal-driven bicycle, including David V. Herlihy, state that Macmillan was not the first inventor. Herlihy states there is no contemporary documentary evidence that a pedal-crank design was applied to a 2-wheeled vehicle and that letters from customers in Scotland to the Michaux company in 1868 state that all of the human-powered vehicles there are tricycles and quadracycles. A similar claim is made by David Gordon Wilson.

== See also ==
- Reported 1830s Scottish bicycle inventions
- Treadle bicycle

== Literature ==
- Clayton, Nicholas (Spring 1987). "The first bicycle!". The Boneshaker. 113: 25–29.
- Dodds, Alastair (1992). Kirkpatrick MacMillan – Inventor of the bicycle: fact or hearsay? Proceedings of 3rd International Cycling History Conference, Neckarsulm, pp. 1–25.
- Oddy, Nicholas (1990). Kirkpatrick MacMillan, the inventor of the pedal cycle or the invention of cycle history? Proceedings of 1st International Cycling History Conference, Glasgow 1990, pp. 24–32.
