= Svea Velocipede =

Early type of bicycle

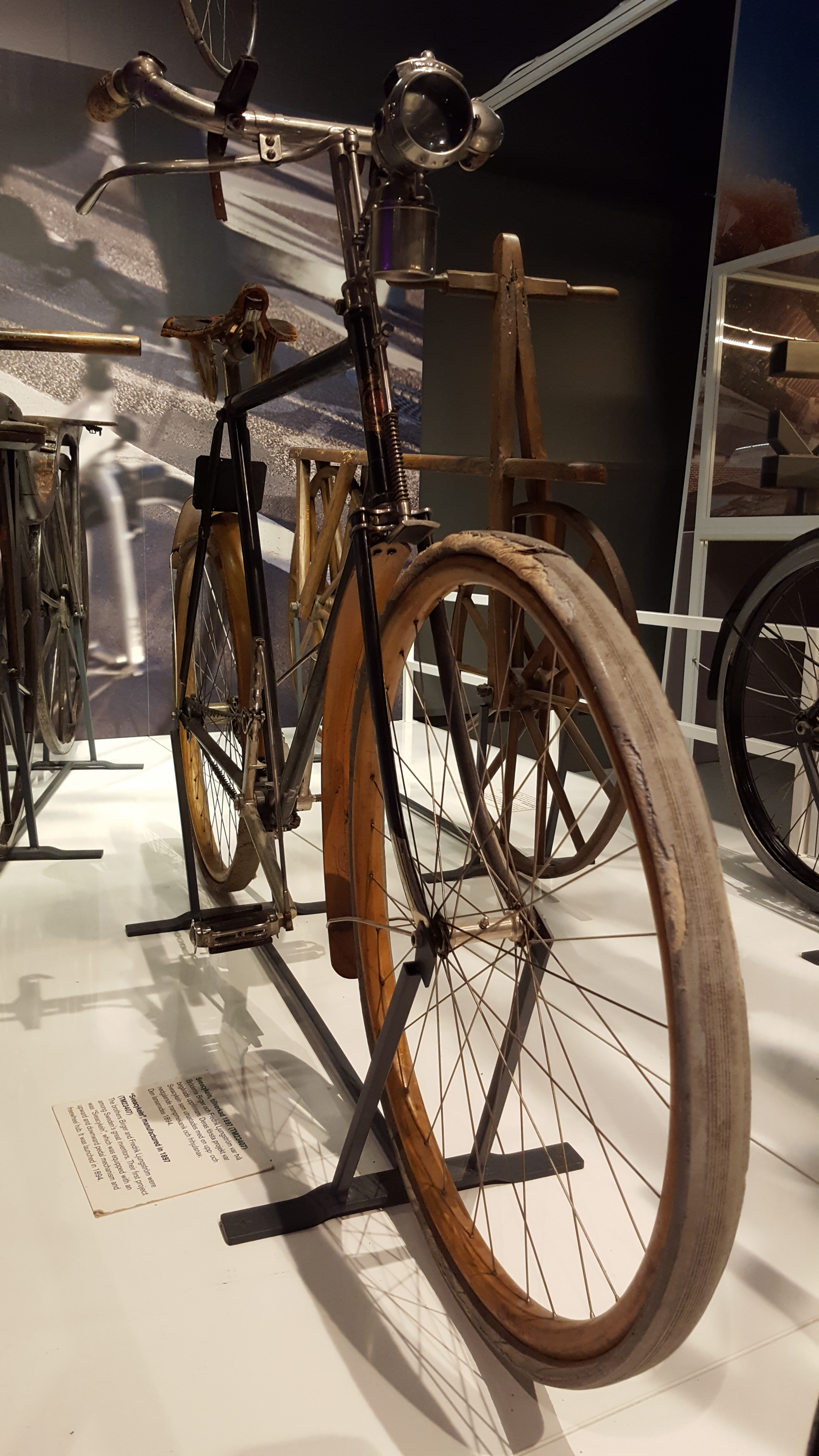
The Svea Velocipede by Fredrik Ljungström and Birger Ljungström, exhibited at the Swedish National Museum of Science and Technology.

The Svea Velocipede was an early bicycle type invented in the 19th century by the Swedish brothers Fredrik Ljungström and Birger Ljungström.

The bicycle employed the today well-established bicycle frame but the drive of the wheel worked according to a completely different principle. The inventors used lever, Stubs Iron Wire Gauge and eccentric instead of chainring, since the bicycle chains used at the time often cracked for a variety of reasons. The bike was driven by pressing the pedal en levers alternately, braked by stepping both pedals at the same time. The freewheel of the Svea Velocipede was patented in 1892.

In connection with Alfred Nobel, the project was further developed and the product sold in a limited quantity of units in Sweden, and the United Kingdom, under the company name The New Cycle Company, to which also George Spaak was connected. It remained in serial production on the market for about 10 years until hitherto technological problems in the production of bicycle chains were overcome. Although the general preference for circular pedal mechanisms became clear with time, later bicycle models on the market would adopt its foot-operated bicycle brakes as well as its free wheeling hubs.

The Svea Velocipede won a Gold Medal of the General Art and Industrial Exposition of Stockholm in 1897, and a Silver Medal of the Exposition Universelle of Paris in 1900. The model has units represented at the Swedish National Museum of Science and Technology, and the Nordic Museum in Stockholm, Sweden.

== See also ==
- Treadle bicycle
- Outline of cycling
- Types of bicycles

== Literature ==
- Sigvard Strandh: Die Maschine: Geschichte, Elemente, Funktion. Ein enzyklopädisches Sachbuch. Herder Verlag, 1980. ISBN 3-451-18873-2 P. 220 and Fig. 221
- Fredrik Ljungström 1875-1964 Uppfinnare och inspiratör (1999) by Olle Ljungström, Sveriges Mekanisters Riksförening, ISBN 91-630-7639-X
