= Ljungström =

Swedish family

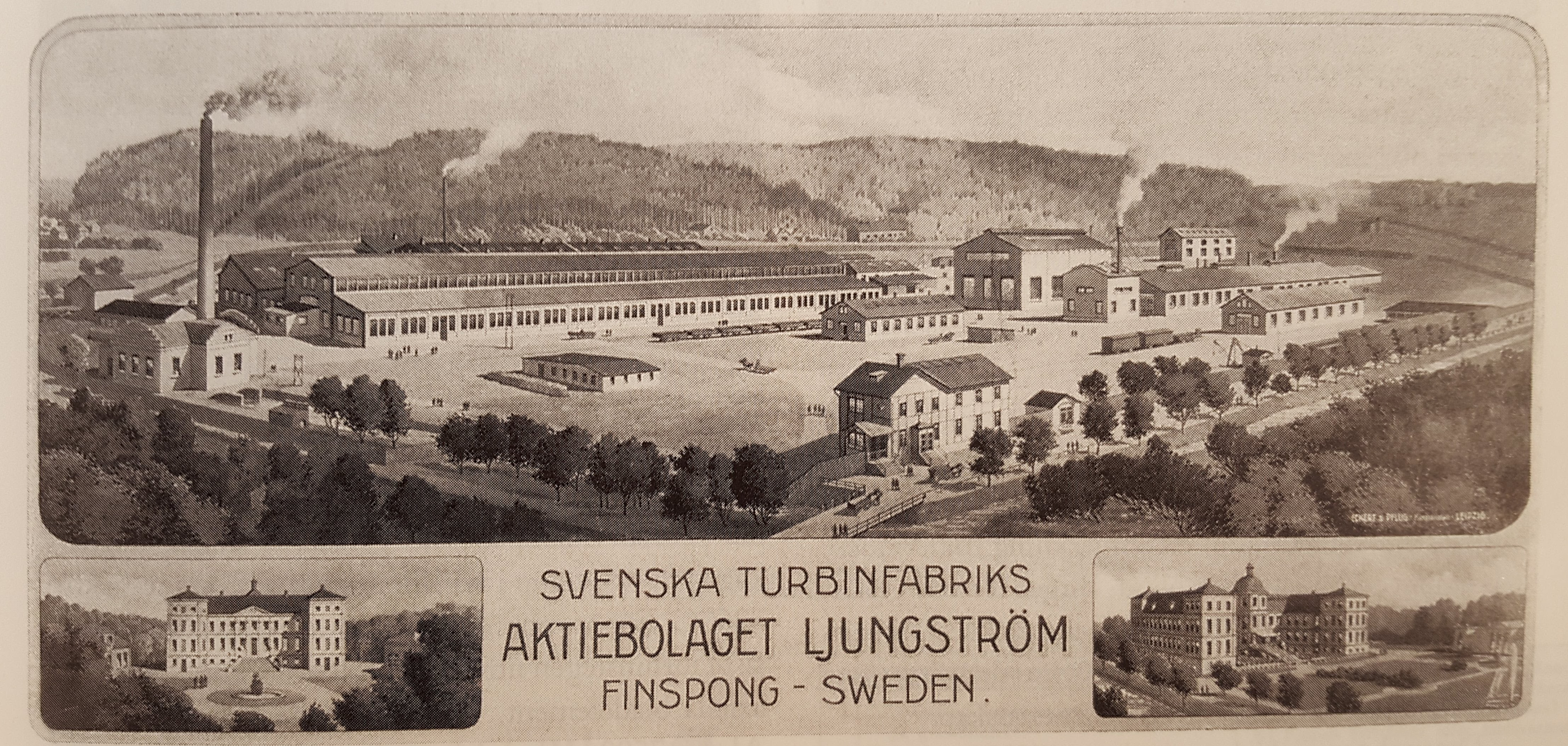
Ljungström Swedish Turbine Manufacturing Co. (Swedish: Svenska Turbinfabriks Aktiebolaget Ljungström, STAL), 1910s.

Ljungström is a Swedish family originating from Jönköping County, Småland, through the bailiff Johan Liungström (floruit 1716, died circa 1730).

== Members in selection ==
- Johan Patrik Ljungström (1784–1859), jeweler
- Jonas Patrik Ljungström (1827–1898), cartographer
- Georg Ljungström (1861–1930), poet
- Oscar Ljungström (1868–1943), engineer, armed forces officer
- Birger Ljungström (1872–1948), industrialist
- Fredrik Ljungström (1875–1964), industrialist
- Gunnar Ljungström (1905–1999), technical designer
- Astrid Ljungström (1905–1986), journalist
- Olof Ljungström (1918–2013), engineer

== See also ==
- Axel Ljungströms Fabriks AB
- Ljungström air preheater
- Ljungström locomotive
- Ljungström method
- Ljungström turbine
- Ljungström sailboat
- Ljungström rig
- Ljungström Engine Syndicate Limited
- Ljungström Steam Turbine Co.
- Ljungström Swedish Turbine Manufacturing Co. (STAL)
  - Stal-Laval Turbin
  - Asea Stal
