= Gunnar Ljungström =

Swedish engineer and technical designer

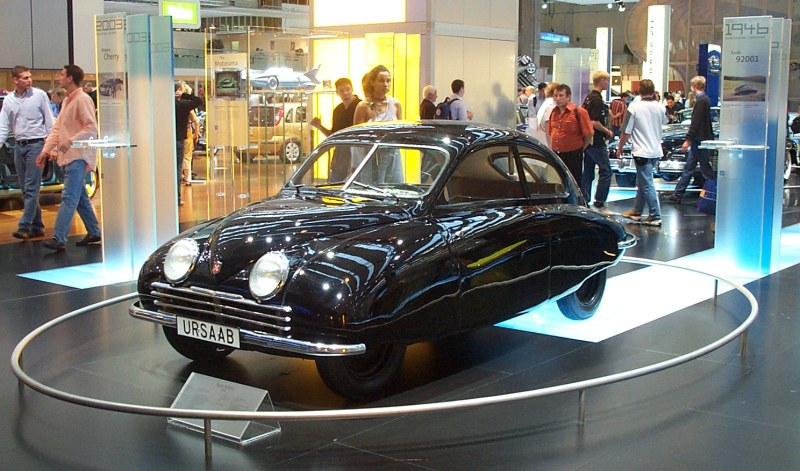
Saab 92001 prototype, developed 1945–1949.

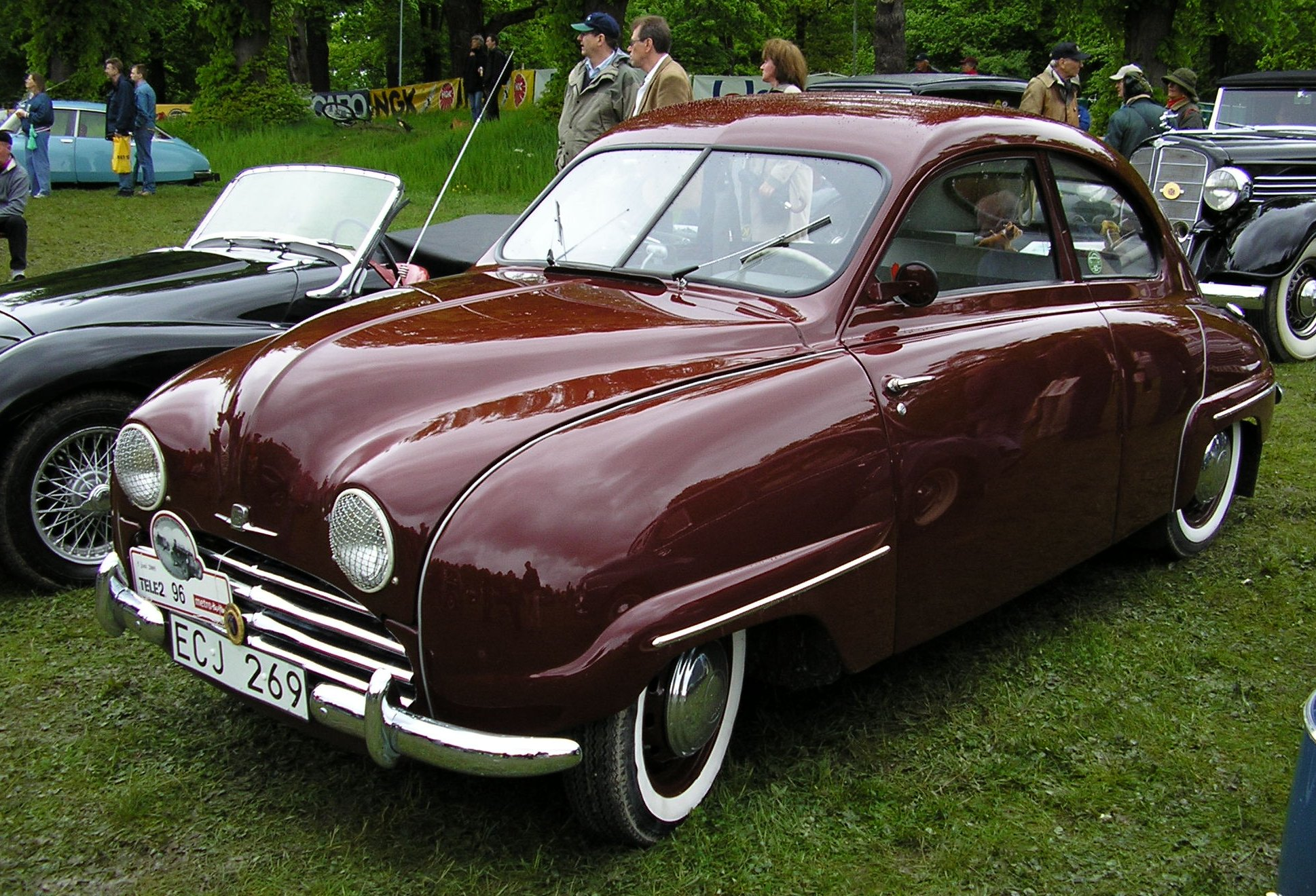
Saab 92, in production 1949–1956.

Gunnar Ljungström (1905–1999) was a Swedish engineer and technical designer, specialised in aerodynamics and automobile industry, pioneering the early history of the Swedish car brand SAAB.

== Biography ==
Gunnar Ljungström was the born in 1905 as son of the industrialist Fredrik Ljungström. After examination from Whitlockska samskolan, he was admitted to studies in mechanics at the Royal Institute of Technology. While there he was elected President of the Student Union at the Royal Institute of Technology, active the constructions of its new student center facilities Nymble in 1930 at the site of the new campus in Stockholm.

Furthermore, he was an avid sailor among other sports, also winning an academic gold medal in Sweden in pole vault. He also pioneered water skiing in Sweden in 1929, culminating in introducing the new sport in slalom moves to the Swedish public at the 100th anniversary of the Royal Swedish Yacht Club in Sandhamn in 1930.

Graduating as engineer in 1932, he participated in the family's steam turbine and other projects, including on transmission technology for cars.

After engagement in family-related businesses and extensive stays abroad, in 1936, Gunnar Ljungström returned to Sweden, deciding to help out with its aviation industry in light of the turbulent affairs on the continent. At Saab, he made extensive contributions in both aerodynamics, and engines during wartime.

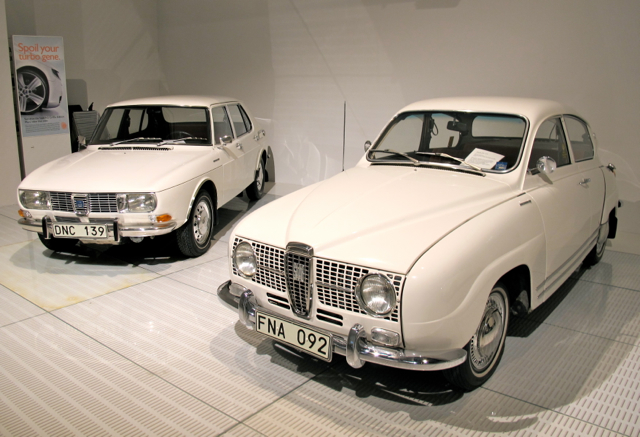
Saab 99 and Saab 96 at the Saab Car Museum, Trollhättan, Sweden.

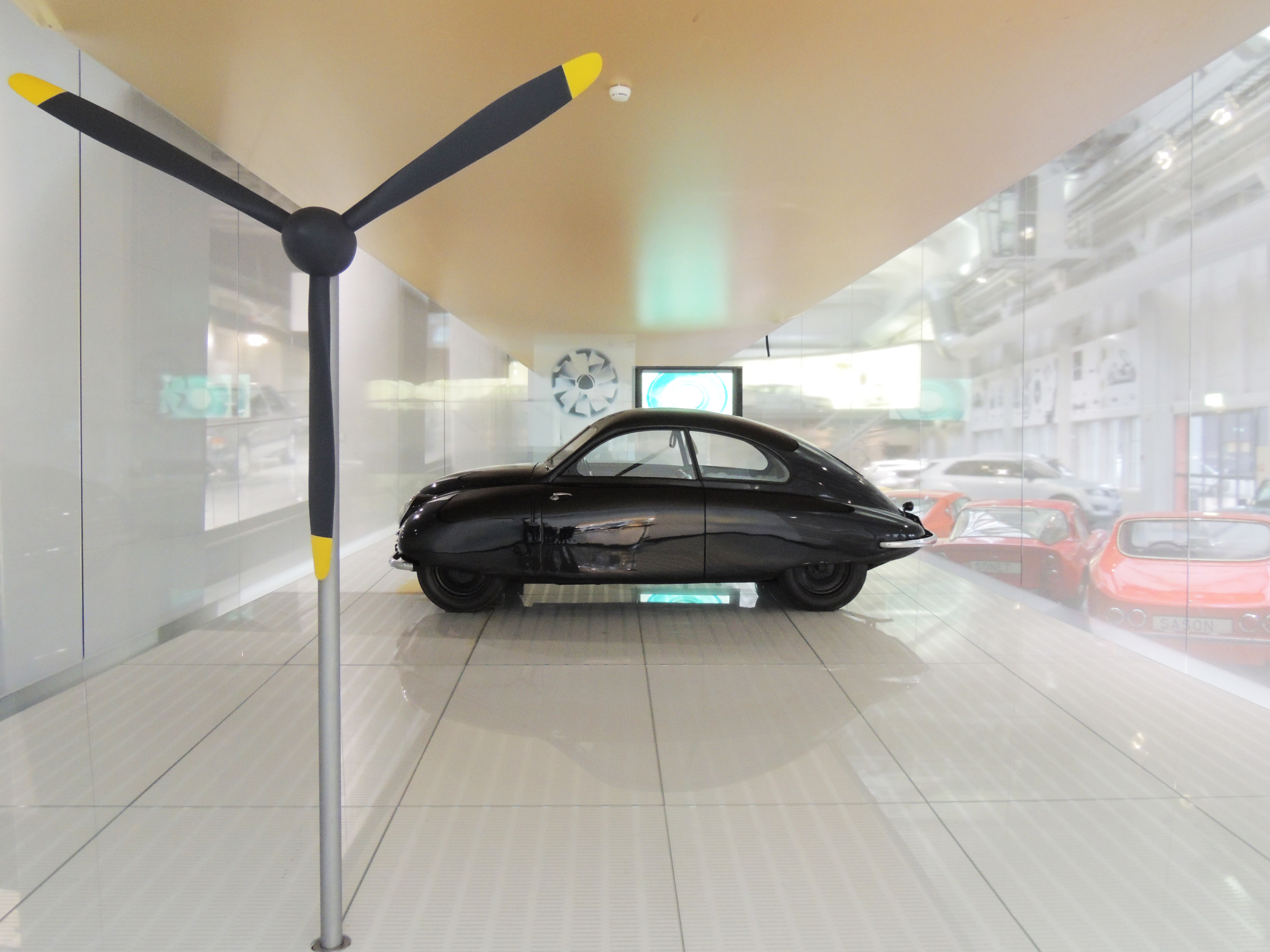
Ursaab at the Saab Car Museum.

After the aviation contributions, post war, he was designated head of Saab Automobile's development team of the company's first automobiles from the 1940s on, with technology based on their aerodynamics design. He would proceed from the release of the Ursaab in 1949 until the 1966 Saab 99, presented for the public in 1967, a couple of years prior to his retirement.

== Distinctions ==
- Sweden: Member of the Royal Swedish Academy of Engineering Sciences
- Sweden: Gold medal of the Royal Swedish Academy of Engineering Sciences
- (Sweden) Clarence von Rosen medal in silver by the Royal Automobile Club
- (Sweden) Ljungström Prize of Svenska Mekanisters Riksförening
- United States: Honorary member of SAE International (first non-American)

== Literature ==
- Fredrik Ljungström 1875-1964 Uppfinnare och inspiratör (1999) by Olle Ljungström, Sveriges Mekanisters Riksförening, ISBN 91-630-7639-X
