= Johan Patrik Ljungström =

Swedish jeweler, inventor, and underwater diving pioneer

- Born: 1784; Stockholm, Sweden
- Died: 1859 (aged 74–75)
- Occupations: Jeweler, inventor
- Spouses: Fredrika Charlotta Skarstedt; Maria Christina (née Spaak); Britta Catharina (née Bagge)
- Children: 12, including Jonas Patrik Ljungström
- Family: Ljungström

Johan Patrik Ljungström (1784–1859) was a Swedish jeweler, inventor, and underwater diving pioneer. He is credited as the first private underwater diver in Sweden, and possibly beyond.

His works, sometimes abbreviated as J. P. Ljungström (J.P.L.) are represented inter alia by the Nordic Museum in Stockholm, and the Museum of Bohuslän.

== Biography ==
Johan Patrik Ljungström was born in Stockholm, Sweden, Christian Fredrik Ljungström, a länsman, and Anna Elisabeth (née Tengman). He married three times: to Fredrika Charlotte (née Skarstedt), Maria Christina (née Spaak), and Britta Catharina (née Bagge). He had children in all three marriages, including Jonas Patrik Ljungström.

Active as a jeweler and burgher in Stockholm, Uddevalla, and Saint Petersburg, Russian Empire, works surviving from his ateliers include ranging from ciboriums preserved by the Church of Sweden, to jewelry for personal adornment represented by the Nordic Museum, as well as regional cultural heritage museums. The jewelry business started by Ljungström was with time overtaken by his descendants, remaining one of the oldest active jewelers in the region.

As an inventor, he was noted for his pioneering work in gas lighting. Subsequent to initial experiments in own ateliers with copper apparatuses and chandeliers of ink, brass and crystal, the technology was exhibitioned in the city of Uddevalla, reportedly one of the first such public installations of gas lightning in the region, enhanced as a triumphal arch for the city gate for a royal visit of Charles XIV John of Sweden in 1820.

Among his side ventures was also early diving bell development, used to recover material from shipwrecks, upon challenge by a Swedish expert Rosenberg that it would be impossible to develop technology to access a designated shipwreck. Hence he invented a diving bell built of tinned copper with space for a crew of 2-3 persons. In 1825, the bell, equipped with compass and methods of communication to the surface, successfully dived down to 25 ells with Ljungström and an assistant on board, "to the awe of the local society, much of which was assembled for the demonstration."

Ljungström went on to author a book presenting technology and ideas for a private sector of underwater diving in Sweden, which was until then still strictly subject of authorities in the form of public diving companies.

Towards the 1830s he relocated to Saint Petersburg, attached to the Evangelical Lutheran Church of Saint Katarina, where also Immanuel Nobel (1801–1872) was active and with whom he may have collaborated in underwater inventions.

Upon return to Sweden towards the end of his life, he settled as a jeweler elder in Stockholm.

== Bibliography ==
- Strödda anteckningar, rörande dykeri- och lots-inrättningarna (And. Johnson, Uddevalla, 1827)
