= Oscar Ljungström =

Swedish archivist, officer, and author

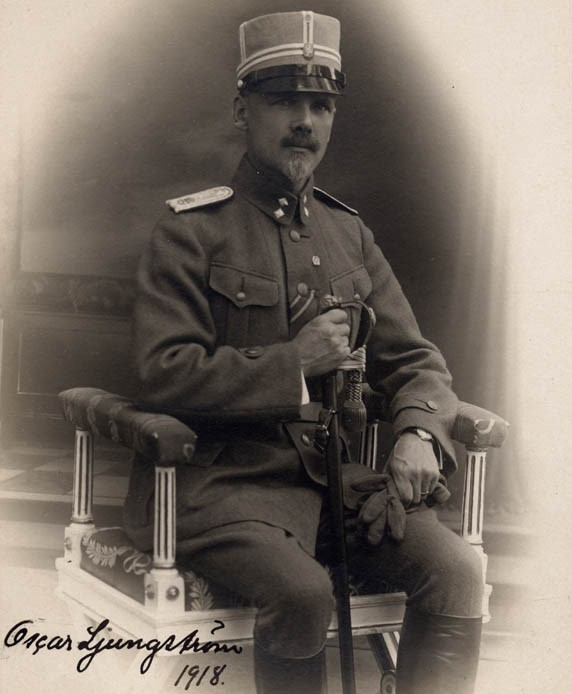
- Ljungström at the time of the Finnish Civil War (1918).
- Born: 7 November 1868
- Died: 17 August 1943 (aged 74)
- Military career
- Allegiance: Sweden; Finland
- Branch: Swedish Army; Finnish Army
- Unit: Whites
- Conflicts: Finnish Civil War

Oscar Ljungström (7 November 1868 – 17 August 1943) was a Swedish archivist, officer, and author.

== Biography ==
Oscar Ljungström was born in 1868 to the cartographer Jonas Patrik Ljungström, and Amalia (née Falck). Among his siblings were Fredrik Ljungström, Birger Ljungström, and Georg Ljungström.

Oscar Ljungstrom served as an archivist in the urban engineering office of Stockholm.

With a background as an officer in the Swedish Landstorm of the Swedish Army, and a determined anti-communist, he joined the White forces under Carl Gustaf Emil Mannerheim in Finland after the outbreak of the Finnish Civil War in 1918. He served as a platoon commander during the war, which the Whites eventually won against the Reds.

Oscar Ljungström had artistic interests and made several visual artworks, working mainly with oil paintings. Yet, writing became his primary element.

Of a family background partly of Christians outside of the mainline Lutheran Church of Sweden, Ljungström's main interests were in philosophy and religion – interests shared by his brother Georg Ljungström – and he wrote extensively on matters of religious philosophy. Theosophy made an impact on European intellectuals and artists of liberal mindset around the turn of the 20th century, and this also applied to the brothers.

Although an outspoken critic of esoterism, he advocated an eclectic ethical approach as opposed to both the state religion and secularism of his time, sparking debate on syncretism, and how Christianity could benefit from the inspiration of Eastern philosophy. After retirement, he resided with the Theosophical Society in Lomaland in California, United States.

Among his last writings was Fredstankens två aspekter (1940), where he expressed hopes for a peaceful coexistence of nations after an anticipated end of World War II.

He died in 1943.

== Bibliography ==
- Fredstankens två aspekter (1940)
- Karma in Ancient and Modern Thought, Lund (1938)
- A Philosophical Overhaul (1937)
- Hold fast, go slow (1934)
- Graded lessons in theosophy (1934)
- Sagan om Visingsö (1925)
- Tvenne världsreligioner. Tankar med anledning av det andliga nutidslivet och kyrkan (1920)
- Motrevolution: socialismens nedkämpande (1917)
- Entwicklungslehre: Entwurf einer neuen Weltanschauung (1907)
- Existenslinjer och utvecklingsnormer (1906)

== Distinctions ==
- (Sweden) Swedish Army: Svenska skyttemärket
- Finland: 4th class of the Order of the Cross of Liberty (1918)
- German Empire: 2nd Class of the Iron Cross

=== Literature ===
- Fredrik Ljungström 1875–1964 Uppfinnare och inspiratör (1999) by Olle Ljungström, Sveriges Mekanisters Riksförening, ISBN 91-630-7639-X
- Hågkomster och livsintryck av svenska män och kvinnor. Saml. 10, Uppsala, 1929
- Oscar Ljungströms efterlämnade papper, Lund University Library, Lund University, including correspondence with Archbishop Nathan Söderblom
- Oscar L: O R Lande-lius' utlandssv saml, SBL:s dep i RA;
- A Henning, Oscar L in memoriam (SvD 23 August 1943)
- https://www.europeana.eu/portal/sv/record/9200106/2736BB73B1A839FCA564AC09823E3A0F0BE89097.html?q=ljungstr%C3%B6m#dcId=1544942773424&p=22
