= Blagge =

Blagge is a surname. Notable people with the surname include:

- George Blagge (1512–1551), English courtier, politician, soldier and poet
- Thomas Blagge (1613–1660), Groom of the Chamber to Charles I and Charles II

== See also ==
- Bagge
