= Saab 401 =

Prototype hovercraft built for the Swedish Navy

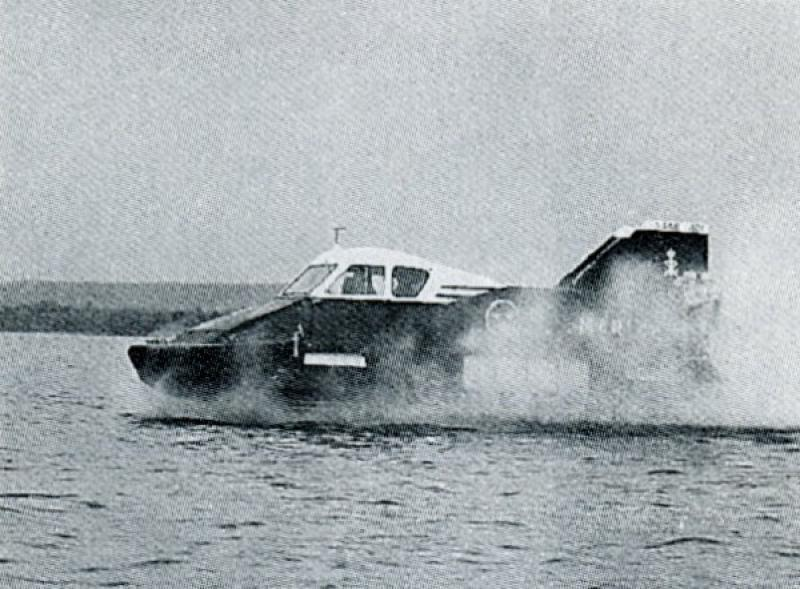
- Saab 401 MEFA

Class overview
- Name: Saab 401 Mefa
- Builders: Saab AB, Karlskronavarvet (Saab Kockums), Vickers-Armstrongs
- Operators: Swedish navy
- In service: 1963–1964
- Completed: 1
- Preserved: 1

General characteristics
- Type: Hovercraft
- Tonnage: 1.63 tonnes
- Length: 7.3 m (24 ft)
- Beam: 3.1 m (10 ft)
- Height: 2.05 m (6 ft 9 in) (on landing pads)
- Installed power: 180 shp (130 kW)
- Propulsion: Lycoming 4 cylinder 4-stroke 180 hp; McCulloch 4 cyl. 2-stroke engine for propulsion engines (later added), 72hp
- Speed: 40 knots (74 km/h)

The Saab 401 MEFA was an experimental air-cushioned vehicle with a weight of 2 tons and capable of about 40 knots on open water with two people on board. A single prototype was built under contract to the Swedish Navy. The craft was first tested in 1963. The Navy retired the project in 1967 when it donated the 401 prototype to the Maritime Museum in Karlskrona Sweden.

== History ==
The Saab 401 MEFA project was created in the late 1950s as a collaboration between Saab and the Royal Swedish Naval Materiel Administration, Karlskronavarvet (Saab Kockums) and the Swedish National Aeronautical Research Institute (FFA). Later the project was continued on lean funds at FFA. MEFA is the Swedish acronym for Markeffektfarkost (ground effect vehicle); the craft was also known as the "MEFAN".

Its design was led by Olof Ljungström. Vickers-Armstrongs was contracted for engineering work.

It was first tested March 4, 1963, in Norrköping. In January 1964, the 401 prototype was delivered to the Berga Naval Base for testing. The craft was retired by the Navy in 1967, and donated to the Karlskrona maritime museum.

== Design ==
The vehicle's lift was created by an eight-blade fan, driven by a 180 hp Lycoming O-360 piston engine. Propulsion was achieved partly with adjustable drive ports in the air chamber, and also by two 72 hp motors driving external propellers. Its hovering height was maximum 17 cm.

The Saab 401 was not equipped with the large rubber-skirts used to direct airflow that are typical in hovercraft. Instead, the vehicle was designed so that it could withstand direct contact with the lake and solid surfaces such as ice.

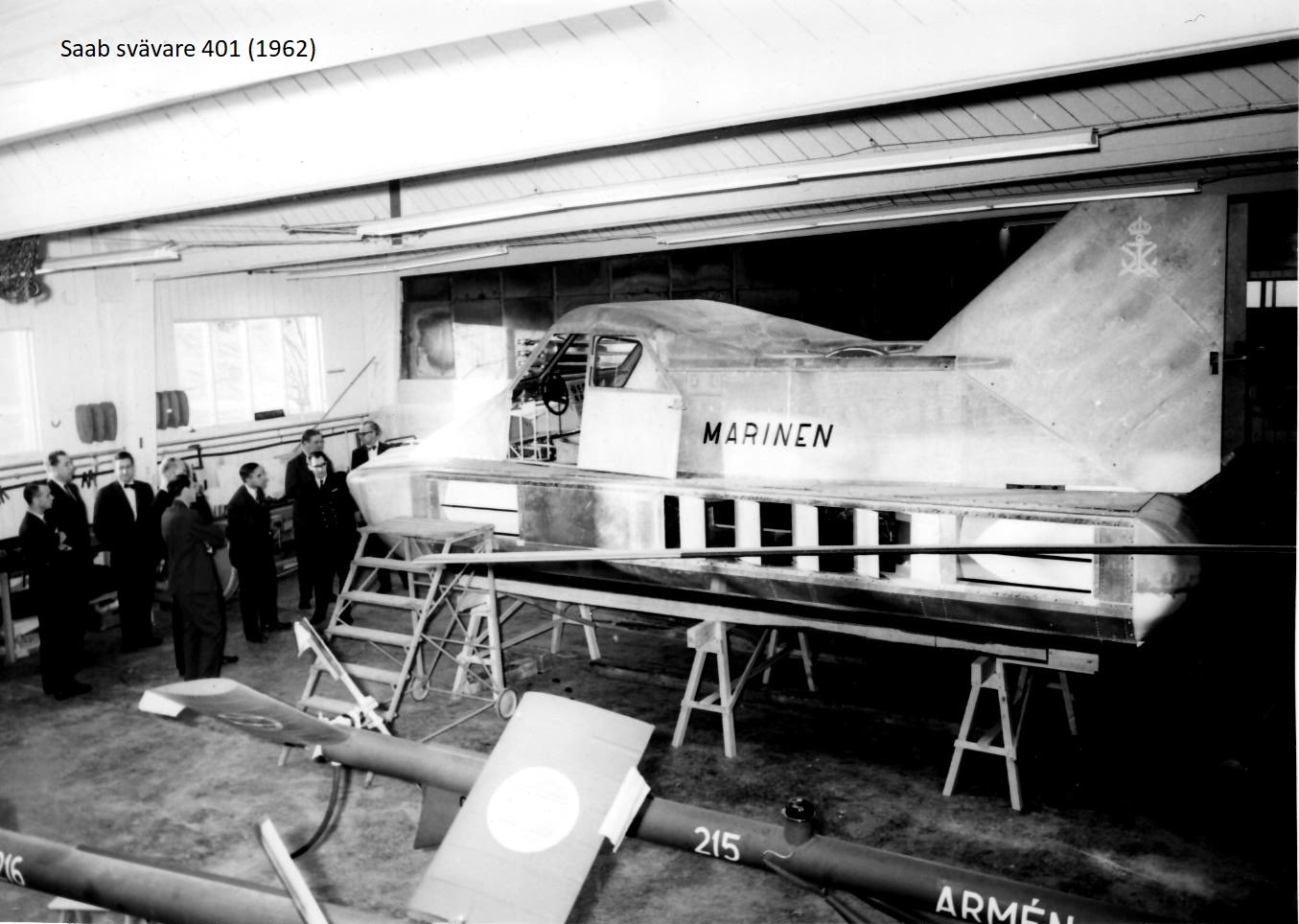
Saab 401 hovercraft circa 1960
