= Teosofisk Tidskrift =

Theology magazine in Sweden (1890–1960)

- Categories: Theology magazine
- Founder: Theosophical Society
- Founded: 1890
- Final issue: 1960
- Country: Sweden
- Based in: Stockholm
- Language: Swedish
- ISSN: 2001-8827
- OCLC: 924044588

Teosofisk Tidskrift (Swedish: Theosophical Journal) was the official organ of the Swedish branch of the Theosophical Society and was in circulation between 1890 and 1960.

== History and profile ==
Teosofisk Tidskrift was established in Stockholm in 1890. It was started by the Swedish chapter of the Theosophical Society and was its official media outlet. The magazine was published on a monthly basis from 1900 to 1948. It came out eight times per year in 1949. Next it appeared quarterly until 1957 and then, came out nine times a year.

Teosofisk Tidskrift had a Norwegian edition between 1902 and 1913 and a Danish edition between 1913 and 1918. The magazine sold 5,000 copies. It mostly featured articles on the relationship between theosophy and Christianity. It also covered the texts of the lectures given at the Theosophical Society. Georg Ljungström was among the staff of the title.

Teosofisk Tidskrift ceased publication in 1960.
