= Astrid Ljungström =

Swedish journalist

Astrid Hulda Viola Ljungström (pen name Attis; 1905–1986) was a Swedish journalist, and war correspondent.

In a doctoral thesis by Kristina Lundgren in 2002, she was referred to as one of three soloist female pioneers of Swedish journalism in the 20th century, together with Barbro Alving, and Maud Adlercreutz.

== Biography ==
Astrid Hanson was born in 1905. In 1925, she married Lieutenant Einar Ljungström (1900–1927); he died in 1927. She studied at the University of Genoa, the Ludwig-Maximilians-Universität München, and the University of Vienna from 1931 to 1935.

She worked at the Swedish-American News Agency 1928–1931, Nya Dagligt Allehanda 1935–1938, and Svenska Dagbladet from 1938. She did extensive political coverage in Europe, including war correspondence in Finland 1939–1940, 1941–1944, Korea 1956, and Hungary 1956, whereafter she specialised in art and antiquities auctions from the 1960s upon her retirement.

== Bibliography ==
- Korea – ofredens land (1956)
- Vi såg det hända (1956)
- Klubbat på auktion (1970)
- Under klubban (1971)
- Stolar på auktion (1973)
- Bord på auktion (1974)
- Klubbat! Auktionspriser från 1960– till 1980-tal (1982)

== Awards and honours ==
- Finland: Order of the Lion of Finland
