= Saab Car Museum =

- Saab Bilmuseum
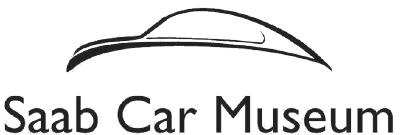

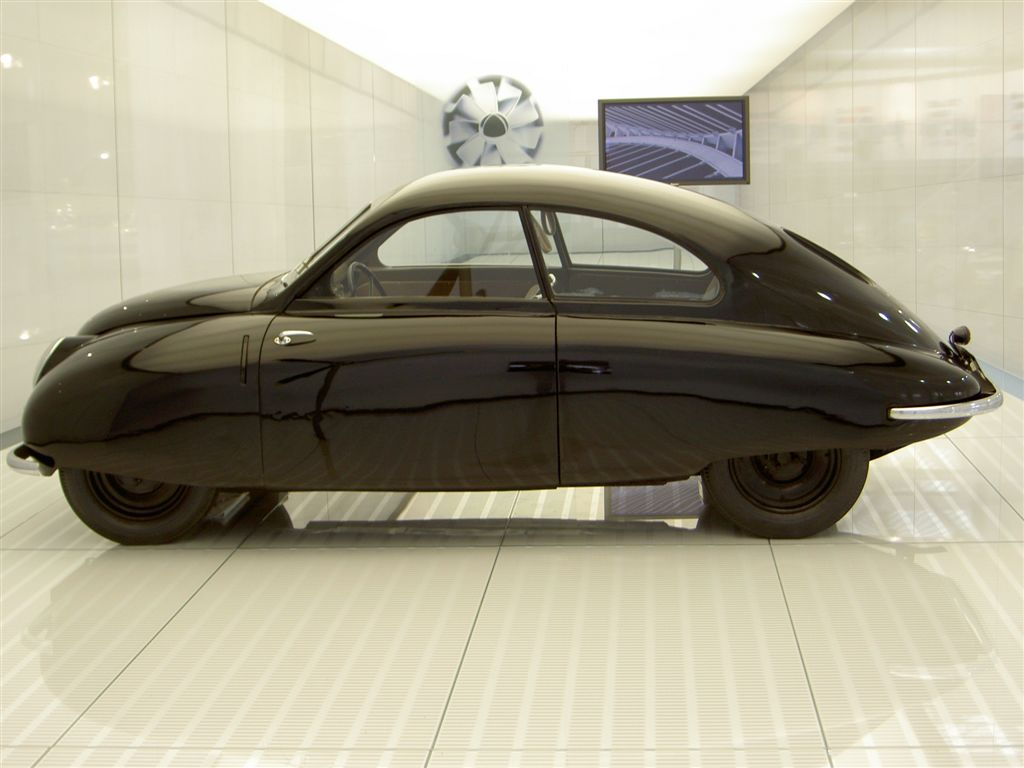
- Saab's very first car, the prototype Saab 92001, at the Saab Car Museum.

- Location within Västra Götaland
- Established
- Location: Åkerssjövägen 18; 461 29 Trollhättan; Sweden
- Coordinates: 58°16′18″N 12°16′34″E
- Type: Automobile museum
- Collection size: 120 vehicles
- Curator: Peter Bäckström
- Website: Saab Car Museum (in English)

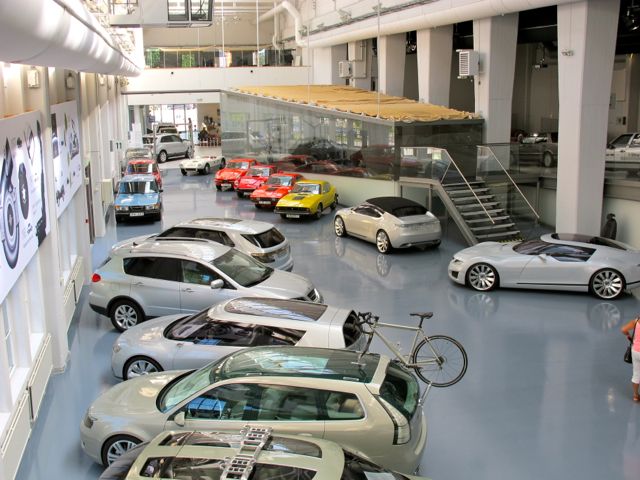
Cars exhibited in the museum

The Saab Car Museum (Swedish: Saab Bilmuseum) is an automobile museum in Trollhättan, Sweden. It covers the history of the Saab brand of automobiles manufactured by Saab under various owners since 1947.

The museum is housed within one of the old factory buildings at Innovatum, a science and technology centre on the former NOHAB industrial estate in Trollhättan.

The museum's collection of about 120 vehicles was scheduled to be publicly auctioned off on January 20, 2012 by Swedish law firm, Delphi, to cover Saab's debts following the company's bankruptcy proceedings. However, the collection was preserved in its entirety by a bid of $4.15 million made by the city of Trollhättan, Saab AB, and the Marcus and Amalia Wallenberg Foundation.

The museum is curated by Peter Bäckström, remains open to the public, and hosts festivals regularly.

== Cars on display ==
The vehicles on display in the museum include:

- UrSaab, Saab's first vehicle, a prototype of the Saab 92
- Saab 92, the first production vehicle produced by Saab
- Saab 93, and variants based on this model
- Saab GT750
- Saab Monster, an experimental variation of the Saab 93
- Saab Sonett, also known as the Saab 94 or Super Sport
- Saab 95
- Saab 96
- Saab 98
- Saab Catherina
- Saab MFI 13
- Saab 97 Sonett II
- Saab 97 Sonett III
- Saab 99, and several variations of the vehicle
- Saab 90
- Saab 900, both the original Saab 900 and the NG900
- Saab 9000, including cars number one and two from "The Long Run" endurance test held in Talladega, Alabama, in October 1986
- Saab 9-3, various years and body styles
- Saab Aero-X
- Saab 9-1X Biohybrid
- Saab 9-1X Air
- Saab 9-X

Many newer models are also on display.

== See also ==
- List of automobile museums
- National Electric Vehicle Sweden
