= Ria Wägner =

Swedish translator and writer

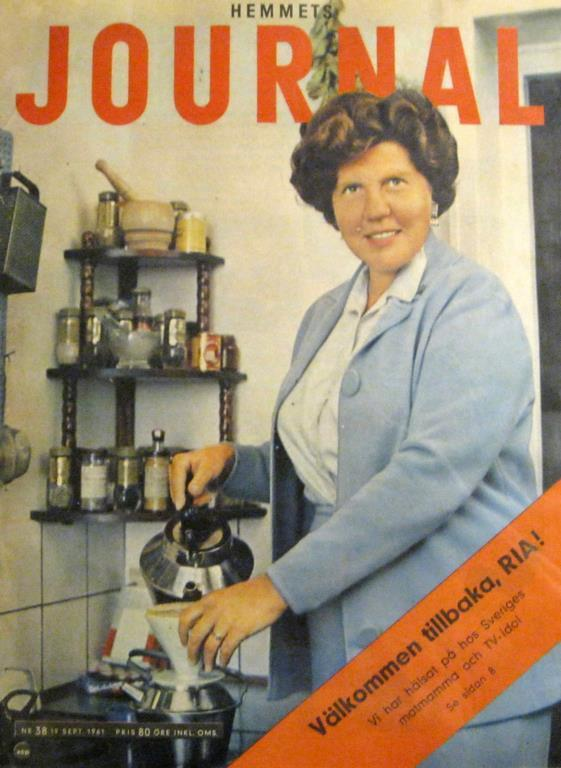
- Ria Wägner på omslaget till Hemmets Journal 38/1961.
- Born: 28 October 1914; Kungsholm parish
- Died: 11 November 1999 (aged 85); Lidingö Parish
- Resting place: Lidingö Cemetery
- Spouse(s): Staffan Rosén
- Children: 1
- Parent(s): Harald Wägner; Ellen Rydelius

Ria Wägner (1914–1999), born Maria Wägner, was a Swedish journalist, author, translator, and television producer, who became one of the first television personalities in Sweden.

Ria Wägner was the daughter of author and translator Ellen Rydelius (1885–1957) and author Harald Wägner (1885–1925). Her paternal aunt was the feminist writer and pacifist Elin Wägner. Her parents separated in 1922, and Ria grew up with her mother, who as a travel writer spent much time in Rome, where Ria went to a school taught by English nuns for two years. When Rydelius and her daughter had returned to Sweden, Ria attended Whitlockska samskolan, graduating in 1933.

Wägner studied at Lund University and graduated with a Master of Arts degree in 1939. She worked as a journalist at Göteborgs Handels- och Sjöfartstidning, Nya Dagligt Allehanda, Vecko-Journalen and Veckorevyn, and she was Editor-in-chief of Idun in 1962–63, until the magazine merged with Vecko-Journalen. She also wrote travel books and cookery books.

In 1956, the year when Swedish television was officially launched, Ria Wägner started working as a television host, for her own show "Hemma med Ria" (At home with Ria). The programme was broadcast from 1956 to 1966, and again from 1970 to 1978, and it focused on cooking, home economics, art, and music. Each programme ended with Wägner making her signature backwards wave at the camera.

She was married to journalist Staffan Rosén 1939–1946, and had two sons with him. She lived together with the author Gustav Sandgren from 1945 until his death in 1983, and the couple had one daughter.

Ria Wägner died on Lidingö in 1999.
