= Ellen Rydelius =

Swedish translator and writer

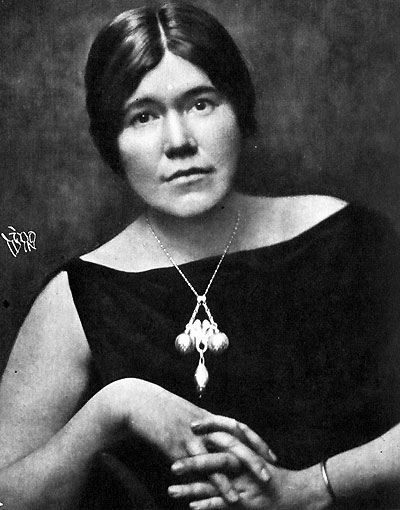
Ellen Rydelius circa 1935

Ellen Rydelius (27 February, 1885 – 1 April, 1957) was a Swedish translator and writer. She wrote a large number of guide books to major cities and several cookbooks but her major works are translations of Russian novels. In particular, she is remembered for her translation into Swedish of Fyodor Dostoevsky's Brothers Karamazov.

== Biography ==
Born on 27 February 1885 in Norrköping, Rydelius was the daughter of Per Axel Rydelius, a merchant, and Anna Vilhelmina Ström. After matriculating from Stockholm's Lyceum för flickor (girls high school) in 1903, she graduated in English and Romance languages at Uppsala University. Thereafter she spent half a year in Russia studying the language, returning home when her father died. She went on to earn her living as a journalist, working for the two main national daily newspapers, Svenska Dagbladet and Dagens Nyheter before turning freelance.

In 1910, she began a highly successful career as a translator, creating Swedish versions of the works of Russian novelists including Leo Tolstoy, Fyodor Dostoyevsky and Anton Chekhov. She also translated from English, French and Italian, including works by Arnold Bennett, Grazia Deledda and John Galsworthy.

She married Sven Harald Wägner, also a journalist, in 1911 but his death in 1925 only reinforced her desire to work. The couple had been separated since 1922. She began to write an extensive series of travel guides in a personalized style, creating Swedish classics such as Rom på 8 dagar (Rome in 8 Days, 1927), Paris på 8 dagar (1928) and Berlin på 8 dagar (1929). Other cities she wrote travel guides about include Prague, Budapest and Vienna. Her daughter Ria Wägner travelled together with her. In the 1940s, when travel was no longer possible, she turned to cookbooks, building on the gastronomic summaries in her guides. They included Billiga dagar i franskt kök (Cheap Days in French Cooking, 1940) and Billiga dagar i italienskt kök (Cheap Days in Italian Cooking, 1941). Finally, she wrote historical works about Russia, books about Swedish women, and two autobiographical works.
