= Whitlockska samskolan =

Building in Stockholm Municipality, Stockholm County, Sweden

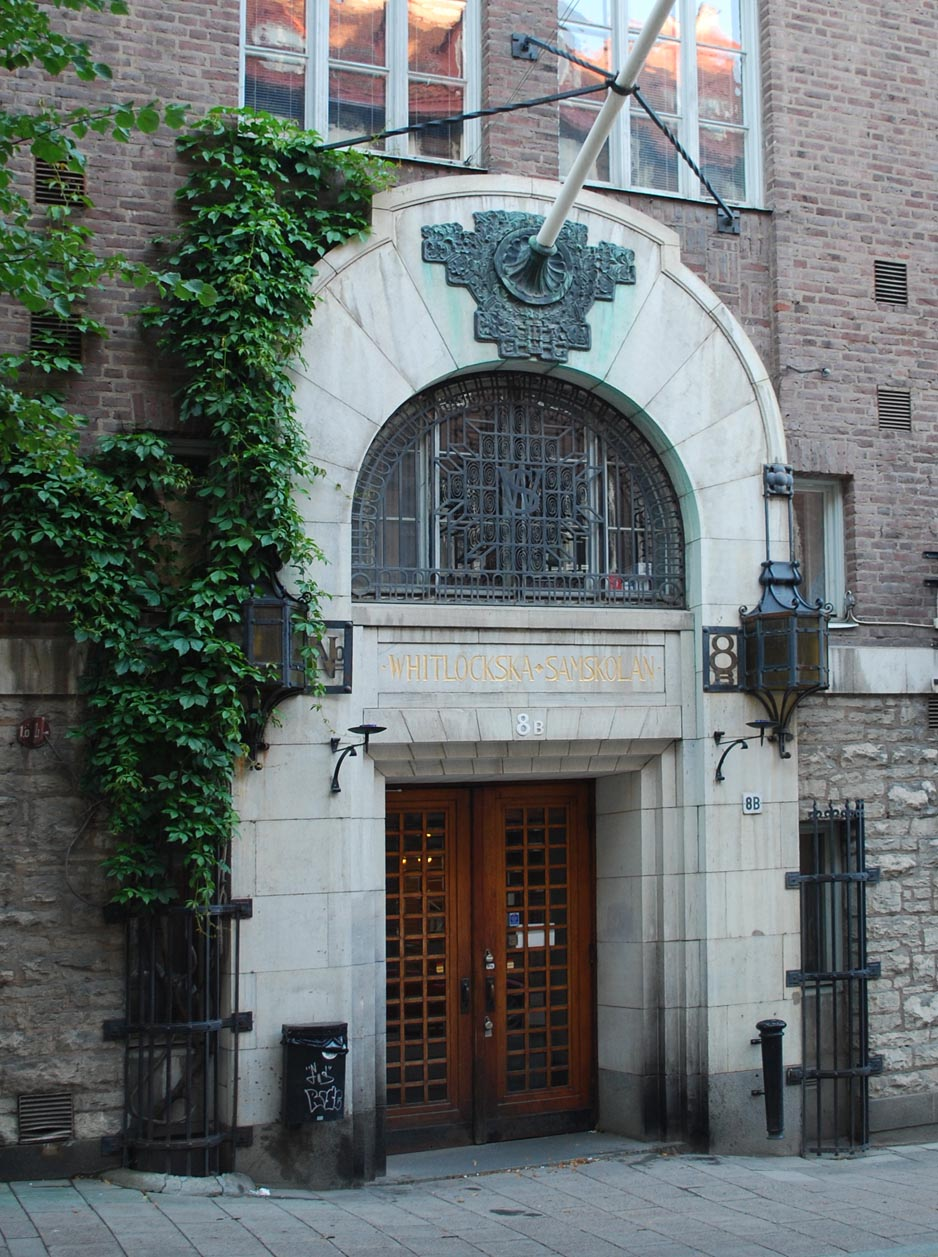
Entrance.

Whitlockska samskolan was a Swedish private secondary school in Östermalm, Stockholm.

The school had its origin as a girls' school founded by the pedagogue and suffragette Anna Whitlock in 1878. In 1893, Whitlock and Ellen Key re-established the school as Stockholms nya samskola (New Co-educational School of Stockholm). The name Whitlockska samskolan was adopted in 1905.

At the time of its founding, the school had an innovative curriculum. In addition to it being one of the first co-educational secondary schools in Sweden, it had student councils and put an emphasis on science education for girls and social sciences for boys. The school did not have classes in Christianity, which at the time was a standard subject in Swedish schools, and adhered strictly to principles of freedom of religion.

The school was closed in 1978.

== Notable alumni ==
- Gunnar Ljungström, engineer
- Olof Ljungström, engineer
- Anna Riwkin-Brick, photographer
- Ria Wägner, journalist and television host
