= Hemmets Journal =

Swedish Magazine

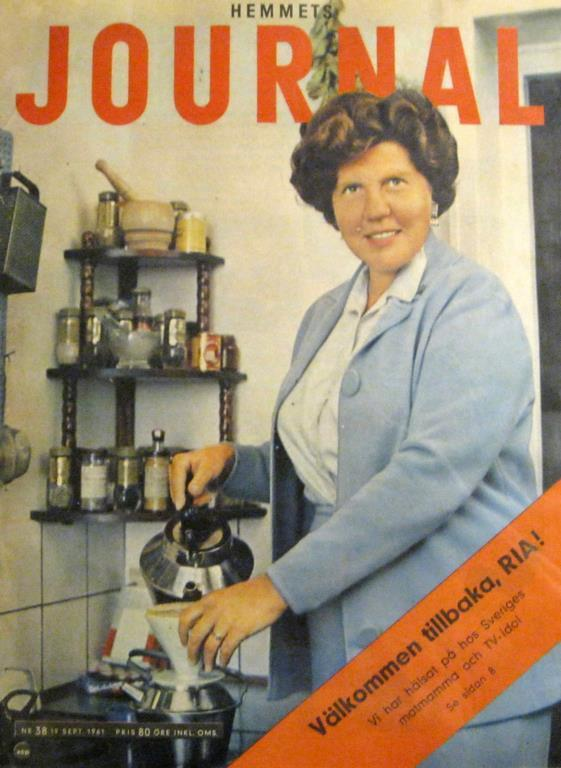
- Cover page of issue 38 dated 1961 featuring Ria Wägner
- Editor: Janne Walles
- Categories: Family magazine
- Frequency: Weekly
- Circulation: 169,100 (2014)
- Founded: 1921
- Company: Egmont
- Country: Sweden
- Based in: Malmö
- Language: Swedish
- Website: Hemmets Journal
- ISSN: 0018-0327

Hemmets Journal (English: Journal of the Home) is a Swedish family magazine published by Egmont. It was the second largest weekly magazine in Sweden in 2009.

== History and profile ==
The first issue of Hemmets Journal was published in 1921. It was a Swedish version of the popular Danish magazine Hjemmet that was first published in 1904. Hjemmet was printed by the Danish publishing company Gutenberghus (which later became Egmont) and the Swedish version was published by its own subsidiary of Gutenberghus, Hemmets Journals Förlag.

The editor-in-chief is Janne Walles, who has held that position since 1990. As of 2008, there are approximately 40 employees working on Hemmets Journal. The magazine's head office has been located in Västra hamnen, a city district in Malmö, since 2005. It was previously located in Kirseberg, also in Malmö.

Statistics have shown that the average readers of Hemmets Journal are 56-year-old women living in smaller cities across Sweden. Features in the magazine include editorials, interviews, fashion reports, crosswords, poetry, horoscopes, and recipes.

== Circulation ==
Hemmets Journal sold 217,800 copies in 2008. The magazine had a circulation of 230,000 copies, with a total of 507,000 readers as of June 2009. In addition, Hemmets Journal had 150,000 online readers in 2007. The magazine's readership decreased by 10,000 people in 2006, and approximately 5,000 readers in 2007. Between January 2007 and January 2009, the readership of Hemmets Journal decreased from 543,000 to 507,000 readers. Allers (with 548,000 readers) is the only weekly magazine that is larger than Hemmets Journal, although Hemmets Journal was larger at the beginning of 2008. Hemmets Journal is also the second largest family magazine in Sweden. In 2014 the magazine sold 169,100 copies.
