= Birger Ljungström =

Swedish engineer, manufacturer and inventor (1872–1948)

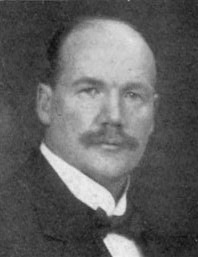
- Birger Ljungström (circa 1920)
- Born: 4 July 1872; Uddevalla, Sweden
- Died: 17 November 1948 (aged 76); Lidingö, Sweden
- Education: KTH Royal Institute of Technology
- Occupations: Engineer; Technical designer Industrialist

Birger Ljungström (4 June 1872 – 17 November 1948) was a Swedish engineer, technical designer, industrialist, and inventor.

== Biography ==
Birger Ljungström was born in Uddevalla, Sweden to cartographer Jonas Patrik Ljungström and Amalia (née Falck). His second great uncle was Johan Börjesson, and his third great uncle Bishop Johan Wingård. Among his siblings were Georg Ljungström, Oscar Ljungström, Fredrik Ljungström, among his brothers-in-law George Spaak and his nephew Olof Ljungström. He attended classes at KTH Royal Institute of Technology.

Ljungström registered his first patent in 1892. He moved to England where they stayed until 1903, in order to study the field of mechanics. During the years 1906-1907, Ljungström was employed by AB Separator. Together with his brother Fredrik Ljungström, he patented the Ljungström turbine around 1908. The same year, they founded the development company AB Ljungströms Ångturbin and in 1913 the separate company Svenska Turbinfabriks AB Ljungström (STAL), which would be responsible for the production of Ljungström turbines.

== Distinctions ==
- (Germany) Honorary doctorate of the Dresden University of Technology (1928)
- (Sweden) Gold medal of the Royal Swedish Academy of Engineering Sciences (1945)
- (Sweden) Adelsköld medal of the Royal Swedish Academy of Sciences (1914)
- (Sweden) Honorary Fellowship of the Royal Swedish Academy of Engineering Sciences (1937) (Fellowship since 1922)

=== Eponyms ===
- (Sweden) Ljungström Prize of the Swedish National Mechanics' Association (1971)
- (Sweden) Birger and Fredrik Ljungström Commemorative Medal of the Royal Swedish Academy of Engineering Sciences (1976)
- (Sweden) Rotor Medal of Svenska Rotor Maskiner (1957)
- (Sweden) Birger and Fredrik Ljungström room at the Finspång Castle
