= Georg Ljungström =

Swedish cartographer, author, and poet

- Born: 1861
- Died: 1930 (aged 68–69)

Georg Ljungström (1861–1930) was a Swedish cartographer, author, and poet.

== Biography ==
Georg Ljungström was born in 1861 to the cartographer Jonas Patrik Ljungström, and Amalia (née Falck). Among his siblings were Fredrik Ljungström, Birger Ljungström, and Oscar Ljungström. A land surveyor by profession, he served as a public cartographer in the state's general power plant.

Of a family background partly of Christians outside of the mainline Lutheran Church of Sweden, Georg Ljungström and his brother Oscar Ljungström shared interests in the new ideas on philosophy and religion. Both would eventually investigate Theosophy. Georg Ljungström was appointed president of the theosophic lodge Orion in Stockholm, and a contributing editor to its publication Teosofisk Tidskrift.

Theosophy made an impact on European intellectuals and artists of liberal mindsets around the turn of the century 1900, including Wassily Kandinsky, Piet Mondrian, and William Butler Yeats. This also applied to Sweden, gathering personalities such as sv:Axel Frithiof Åkerberg, sv:Viktor Pfeiff, and sv:Per Henrik Rudolf Cederschiöld, while influencing circles such as the artist group The Five. This latter group, known for their interests in combining art with spirituality, included Hilma af Klint, and sv:Charlotta Cassel, of which at least the latter is assumed to have been in contact with Georg Ljungström.

Both Ljungström's poetry and essays also influenced the author August Strindberg after the latter's Inferno period in the later part of his life, attested inter alia in his En blå bok (1907–1912), and Ockulta dagboken (posthumously published 1977). Keeping the poet's writings in his library with extensive commentary, Strindberg lavished Georg Ljungström with praise.

== Bibliography ==
- Nostradamus och Anton Johanssons profetior om nu stundande världshändelser (editions 1924, 1928, 1939), Litteraturförlaget, Stockholm
- Mellan de stora världskrigen, det gångna och det kommande: strödda tankar (1921)
- Teosofisk Tidskrift: 1895–1909; 1895, 1899, 1902, 1906
- En teosofs svar på Karl af Geijerstams "Modern vidskepelse" (1892)
