= Saab Ursaab =

Car prototype, 1945–1949

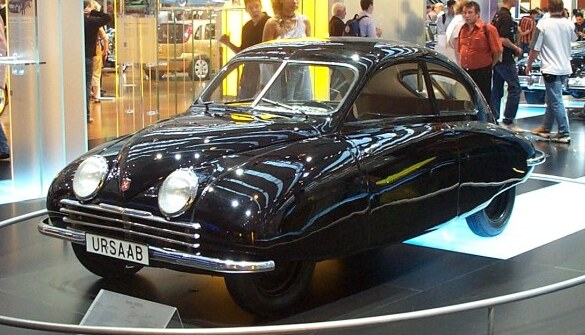
Ursaab

Ursaab (lit. Proto-Saab), also known as 92001 and X9248, was the first of four prototype cars made by Saab AB, which at that time was solely an aeroplane manufacturer, leading to production of the first Saab car, the Saab 92 in 1949. The car is now in the Saab Car Museum in Trollhättan. The name "Ursaab" means "original Saab".

The model was developed by a 16-person team led by engineer Gunnar Ljungström and designer Sixten Sason.

== Design ==
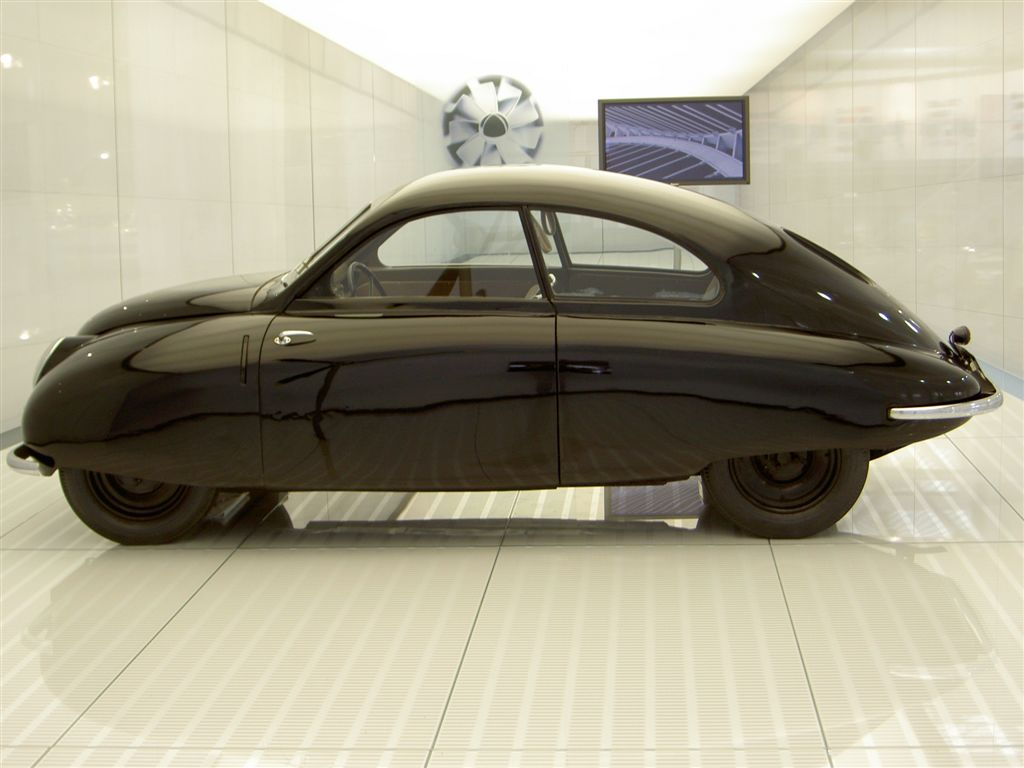
Side view

An automobile design project was started in 1945 by Saab AB, a manufacturer of warplanes, with the internal name X9248. The design project became formally known as Project 92; the 92 being next in production sequence after the Saab 91, a single engine trainer aircraft. The aim was to design a car that would compete with small German cars like Opel Kadett, VW Beetle, DKW and Adler. The target consumer price was 3200 SEK. Bror Bjurströmer, who was then head of the design department, developed a 1:25 scale sketch and the overall design specifications, which included the following: a wheelbase of 2.75 metres (108.3 in) and total length of 4.5 metres (177.2 in); employment of a monocoque design; 50% less drag than other cars; 800 kilogram maximum weight; power from a transverse-mounted two-stroke engine; and front-wheel drive. The choice of rear-hinged doors was made by Gunnar Ljungström (head of the development team) as he wanted to lessen the risk of damaging doors whilst driving out of a garage. The company made four prototypes, 92001 through to 92004, before designing the production model, the Saab 92, in 1949.

== Development ==
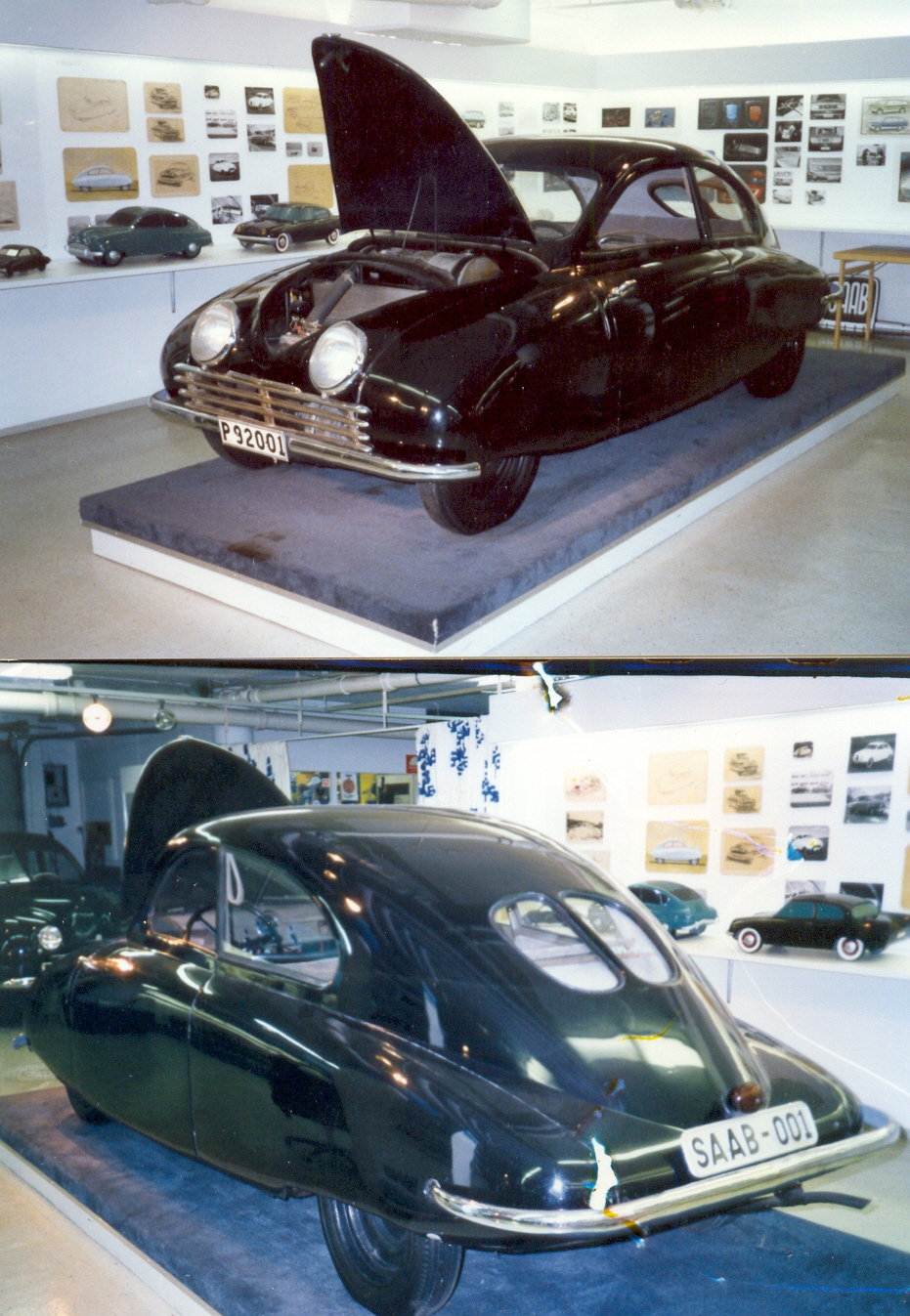
Ursaab

Development was started in Linköping by a 16-person team led by engineer Gunnar Ljungström and designer Sixten Sason. The immediately preceding Saab production code was for an aeroplane - the Saab 91 Safir. It was for this reason that the first car project was called the Saab 92. Normally the development would have been handled by the testing workshop, but it was busy with the Saab 91 Safir and the Saab 90 Scandia. Thus the tool workshop, which had a lighter workload at that juncture, was given the assignment.

The engineers responsible for making the prototype had no prior experience in making cars, and out of the 16 engineers only two had a driving licence. They needed information about the car manufacturing process, but had to simultaneously keep the project secret. A few visits were made to Nyköpings Automobilfabrik (later ANA), but as the extent of their work involved the simple installation of bodies on imported ladder frame chassis, the engineers were not able to gather as much information as they had hoped. Also, since all available literature only described how cars were made before the war, they realised that much of the manufacturing process would have to be learned on their own. Close to SAAB's factory a junkyard provided the engineers with both parts and inspiration. They also purchased a number of cars to study, including a DKW, a Hanomag, an Opel Kadett and a Volkswagen.

Structural integrity concerns led to other design decisions. The team tasked with that portion of the project was used to building aircraft where every opening was covered with a load-bearing hatch. Since this was not viable on an automobile, it was decided that the body structure should be strengthened through the use of a rear window that was as small as possible and which used a split-window design, and omission of a rear bootlid.

Because the car had to have a very low drag coefficient,0.3, which even today is considered very impressive, aerodynamic tests were part of the early evaluations. Thus, the body was of novel design and, with safety in mind, it provided damage-resistance in the event of an accident. Winter driving capability was enhanced via front-wheel-drive and wide wheel arches which allowed for snow accumulation without obstruction of the wheels.

== Construction ==
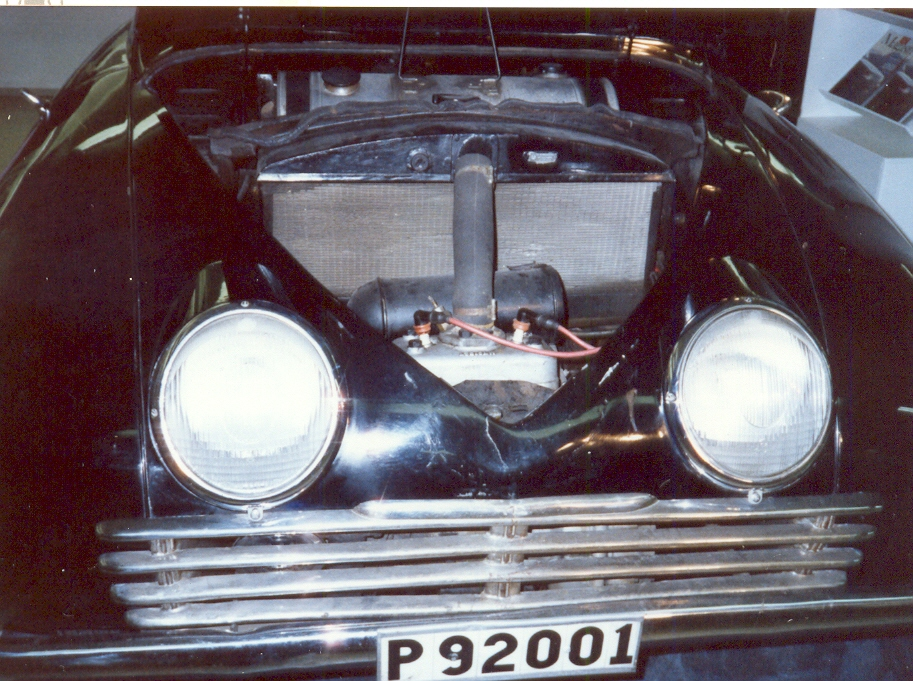
Transverse two-cylinder two-stroke

Using some carpenters from Motala, a full size mock-up in alder wood was built in the spring of 1946. The model was coloured black using shoe polish. Some extra workers were recruited from Thorells Kylarfabrik in Linköping for building the steel body. Hand-shaping the 1.2 mm thick steel sheets proved to be difficult work. By summer 1946 the first prototype body was ready, hand beaten on a wooden jig. Shaping of the metal was done in Saab's secret factory 30 metres below ground.

The colour was a problem - the Managing Director wanted it painted black, but the vice MD wanted it blue. But the workshop had already purchased black paint, making it a moot point. The SAAB paint workshop did not have the capacity to handle the paint job so the builders contacted Aktiebolaget Svenska Järnvägsverkstäderna (ASJ), the Swedish railroad works in Arlöv. This firm was experienced in painting railway cars and buses. Having been told that their assistance was needed in painting a car, the company was initially reluctant to help since it was thought that the vehicle was a management car such as a DeSoto or something that would take a lot of time. However, when it was learned that the vehicle was a prototype of a new car, ASJ quickly took the job.

The prototype had a borrowed 13 kW (18 hp) two-cylinder two-stroke engine, which was placed transversely in the front of the vehicle. The first engine and gearbox came from a DKW vehicle, but they were later replaced with an engine and gearbox designed by Gunnar Ljungström. The prototype engine blocks were made by Albinmotor. The head of the firm, Albin Larsson, was hesitant to take work since the cooling pipes in the engine block were considered to be complicated. After test driving the prototype, however, Larsson changed his mind.

Ursaab was driven over 530,000 kilometers (330,000 mi), typically in utter secrecy, and usually on narrow and muddy forest roads and in early mornings or late nights. Today it is in the Saab museum in Trollhättan, with a cleaned grille and more roadworthy headlights. The name "Ursaab" means "original Saab".

The Ursaab design was improved by Sixten Sason in 1947, resulting in another prototype: the 92002. The most remarkable difference between 92001 and 92002 is the hood (bonnet). The earlier hood design and the use of a hood mechanism from an Opel Kadett made removal of the engine difficult, as one would have to turn it 90 degrees and bring out the drive package with the gearbox first. Inspired by American cars that had cascading front-ends, the redesigned hood allowed for improved access to the engine bay. After an additional four prototypes the design was ready for production as the Saab 92. Ursaab was first shown to the press on June 10, 1947 at Saab AB's headquarters.
