= STAL Dovern =

1950s Swedish turbojet aircraft engine

Dovern
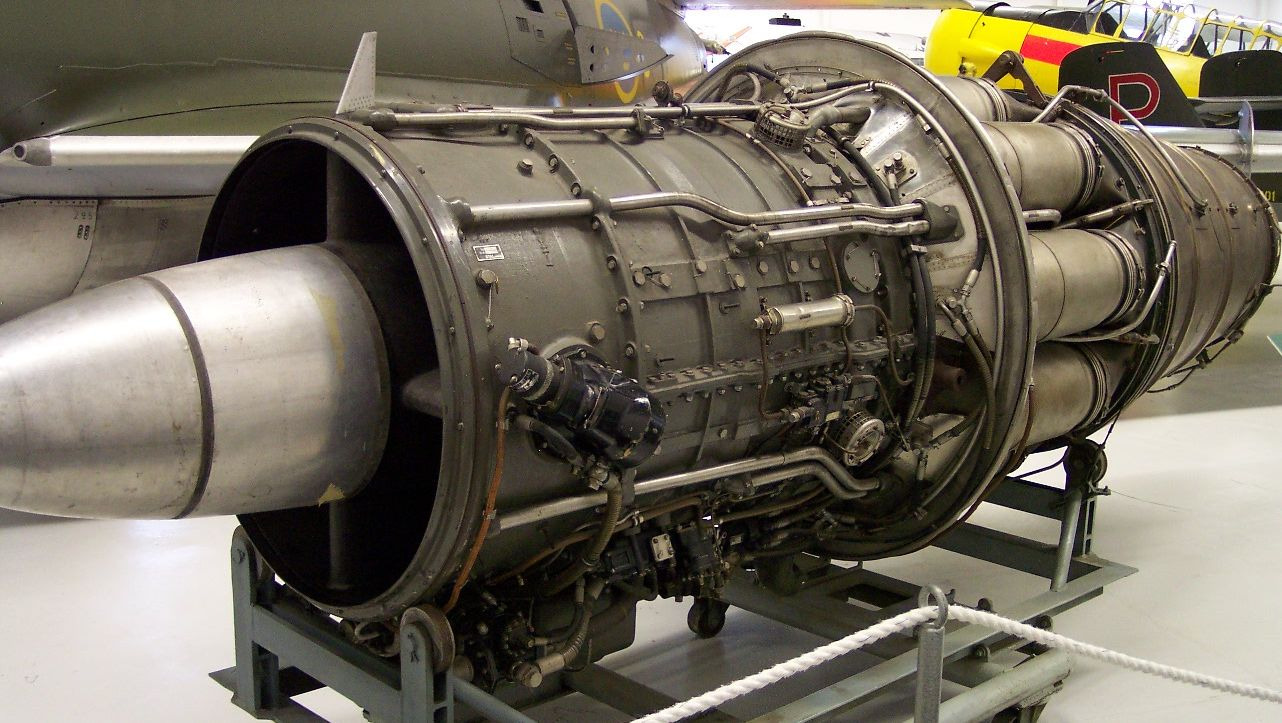
- Type: Turbojet
- Manufacturer: Svenska Turbinfabriks AB Ljungström
- First run: 1951
- Major applications: Saab 35 Draken (intended)

The STAL Dovern was a Swedish turbojet design of the early 1950s, named after a lake in Finspång municipality in Östergötland, Sweden. Intended to power the Saab 35 Draken, this aircraft was powered by the Rolls-Royce Avon instead. The Dovern did not enter production.

== Design and development ==
The STAL company had been designing steam turbine engines and in the 1940s begun designing gas turbine engines. Their first running engine was the Skuten, ground tested in 1949 but not flown. The Dovern was the next design, featuring a nine-stage axial compressor and single-stage turbine. First run in 1951, the engine was flight tested during 1953 using an Avro Lancaster provided by Air Service Training. The engine was installed underneath in a nacelle faired-in to the Lancaster's bomb bay. After several thousand hours of ground running and more than 300 hours of flight testing the engine was not selected, the Rolls-Royce Avon being preferred.

== Applications ==
- Avro Lancaster (test bed only)
- Saab 35 Draken (intended application)

== Variants ==
Dovern
Base variant.

Dovern IIA
Basic engine without de-icing

Dovern IIB
Compressor bleed air system added for ice protection.

Dovern IIC
Afterburning version producing 45 kN (10,200 lbf) thrust.

== Specifications (Dovern IIB) ==
Data from Flight. Jane's 1955-56

==== General characteristics ====
- Type: Turbojet
- Length: 3,850 mm (151.57 in)
- Diameter: 1,095 mm (43.11 in)
- Dry weight: 1,220 kg (2,690 lb) dry

==== Components ====
- Compressor: Nine-stage axial flow
- Combustors: Nine combustion chambers
- Turbine: Single-stage
- Fuel type: Aviation kerosene to D.Eng R.D. 2482
- Oil system: Dry sump with gear pressure and scavenge pumps at 240–310 kilopascals (35–45 psi)

==== Performance ====
- Maximum thrust: 32.29 kN (7,260 lbf) at 7,200 rpm at sea level for take-off
- Overall pressure ratio: 5.2:1
- Air mass flow: 54.9 kg/s (121 lb/s)
- Turbine inlet temperature: 870 °C (1,140 K; 1,600 °F)
- Specific fuel consumption: 0.009 kg/(kN h) (0.92 lb/(lbf h))
- Thrust-to-weight ratio: 2.76:1

== See also ==
Comparable engines

- Avro Canada Orenda

Related lists

- List of aircraft engines
