= Ljungström turbine =

Type of steam turbine

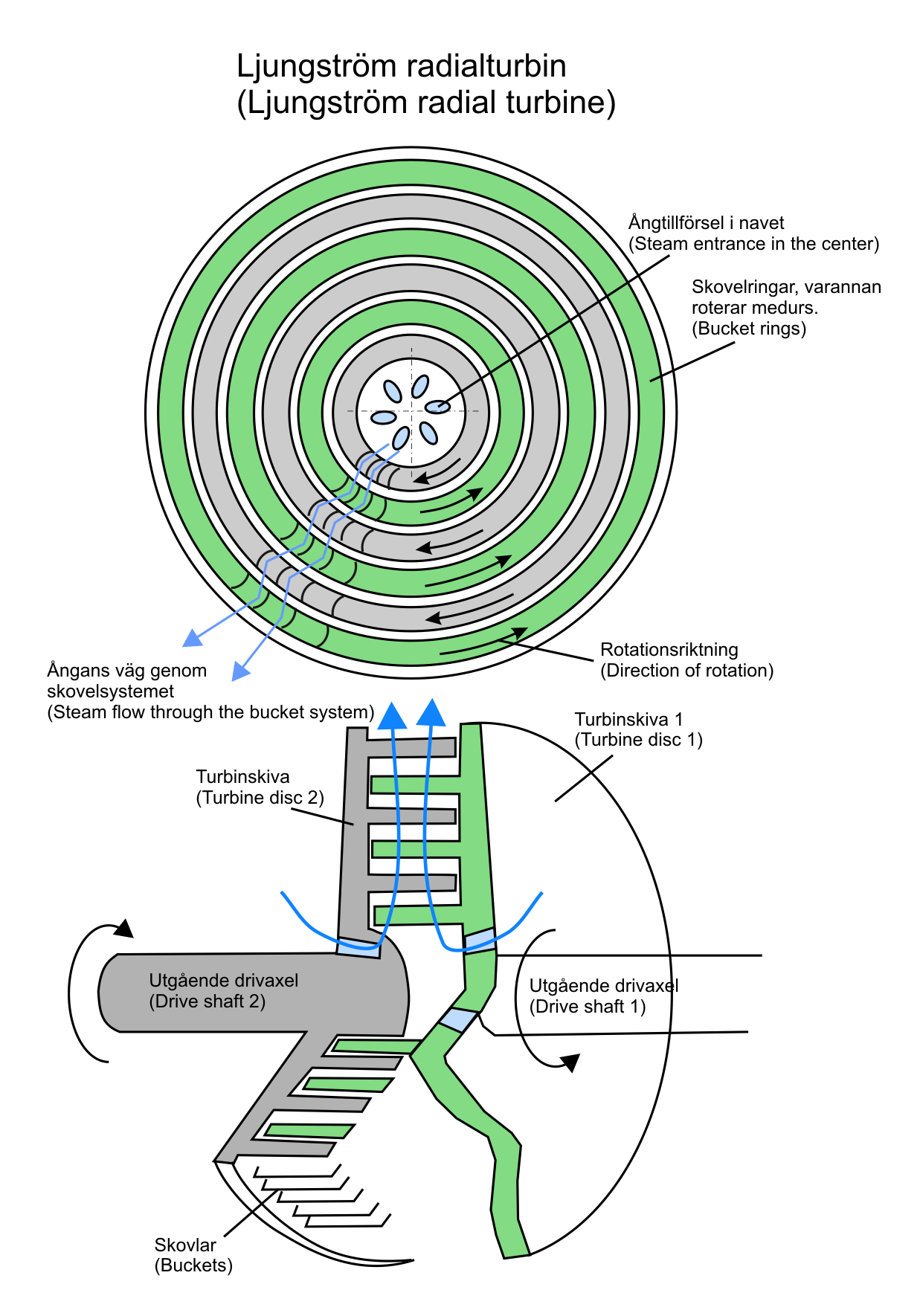
Functional principle of the Ljungström turbine

The Ljungström turbine (Ljungströmturbinen) is a steam turbine. It is also known as the STAL turbine, from the company name STAL (Swedish: Svenska Turbinfabriks Aktiebolaget Ljungström). The technology has had numerous uses since its conception, from power plants to vehicles as large as the supertanker Seawise Giant.

The turbine was invented circa 1908 by the Swedish brothers Birger Ljungström (1872–1948) and Fredrik Ljungström (1875–1964). The Ljungström brothers were creative, versatile inventors, typical of the 19th century. They not only named the turbine type, but also an early form of a bicycle.

== Functionality ==
The steam flows through the machine in a radial direction from the centre to the outer extremities. The turbine consists of two halves that rotate against each other. As a result, each rotor blade of the one turbine half serves simultaneously as the guide blade of the other half. The different direction of rotation of the two halves is either compensated by a gearbox connected downstream or by separate generators if the turbine is used for the generation of electrical power. The Ljungström turbine can either be used with a condenser to recover the exhaust steam as condensate, or alternatively the exhaust can be utilised for the supply of a district heating grid, and thus the turbine is flexible in its application. It was therefore used in large industrial complexes, which could use the exhaust of this engine for both combined heat and power as well as its electric energy. The functionality has been employed for several power plants.

In principle, the maximum power possible is about 32 MW, since the diameter of the two turbine halves are limited to a practical size due to fabrication constraints. Coupled with a Parsons turbine, the output of a Ljungström turbine can be increased to about 50 MW. Since more modern steam power plants have a significantly higher performance, the Ljungström turbine is generally no longer utilised today. The largest ship ever built, the ULCC supertanker Seawise Giant, was powered by this type of engine.

== Gallery ==
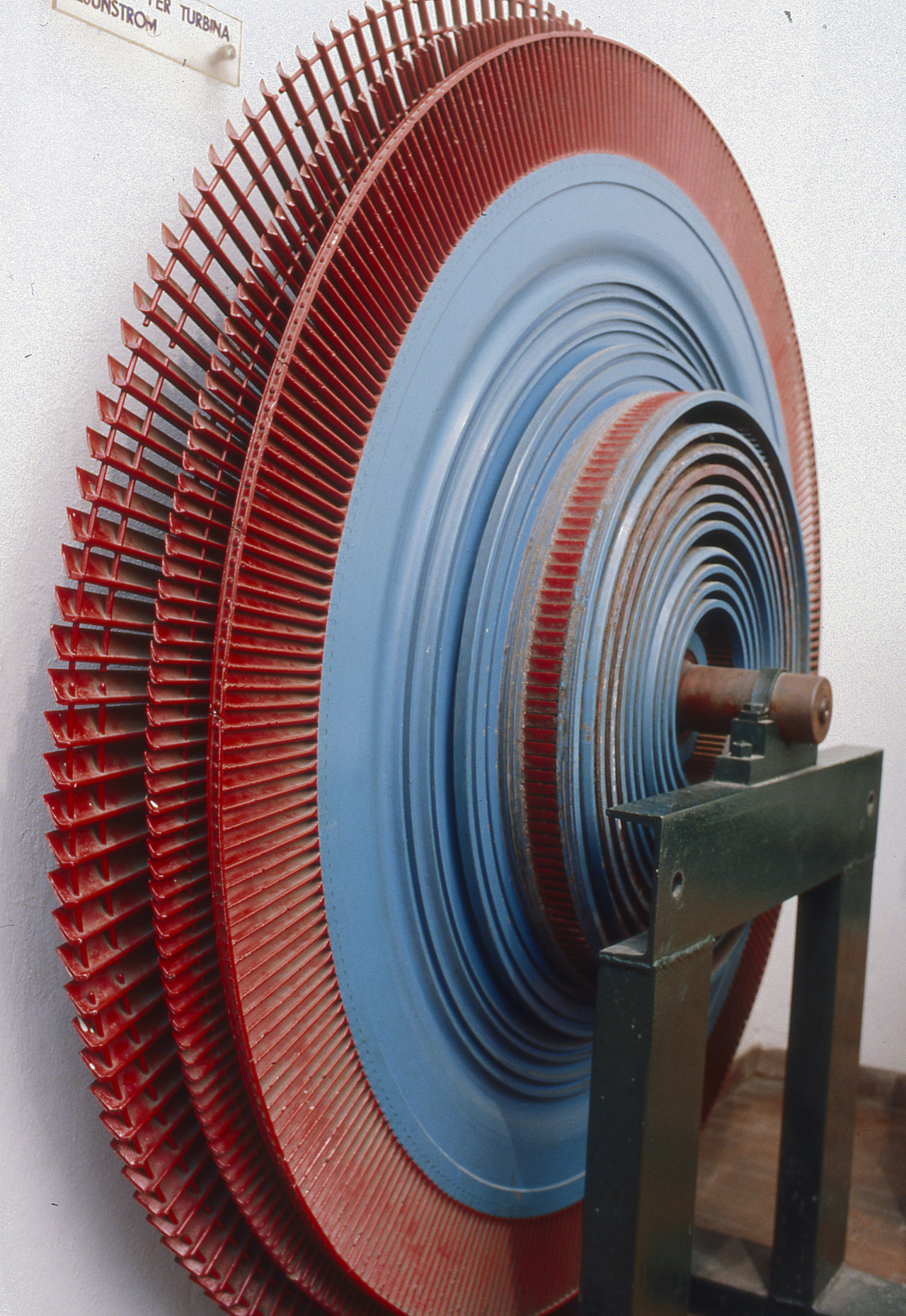
Radial impeller for Ljungstrom turbine - Museo scienza tecnologia, Milan

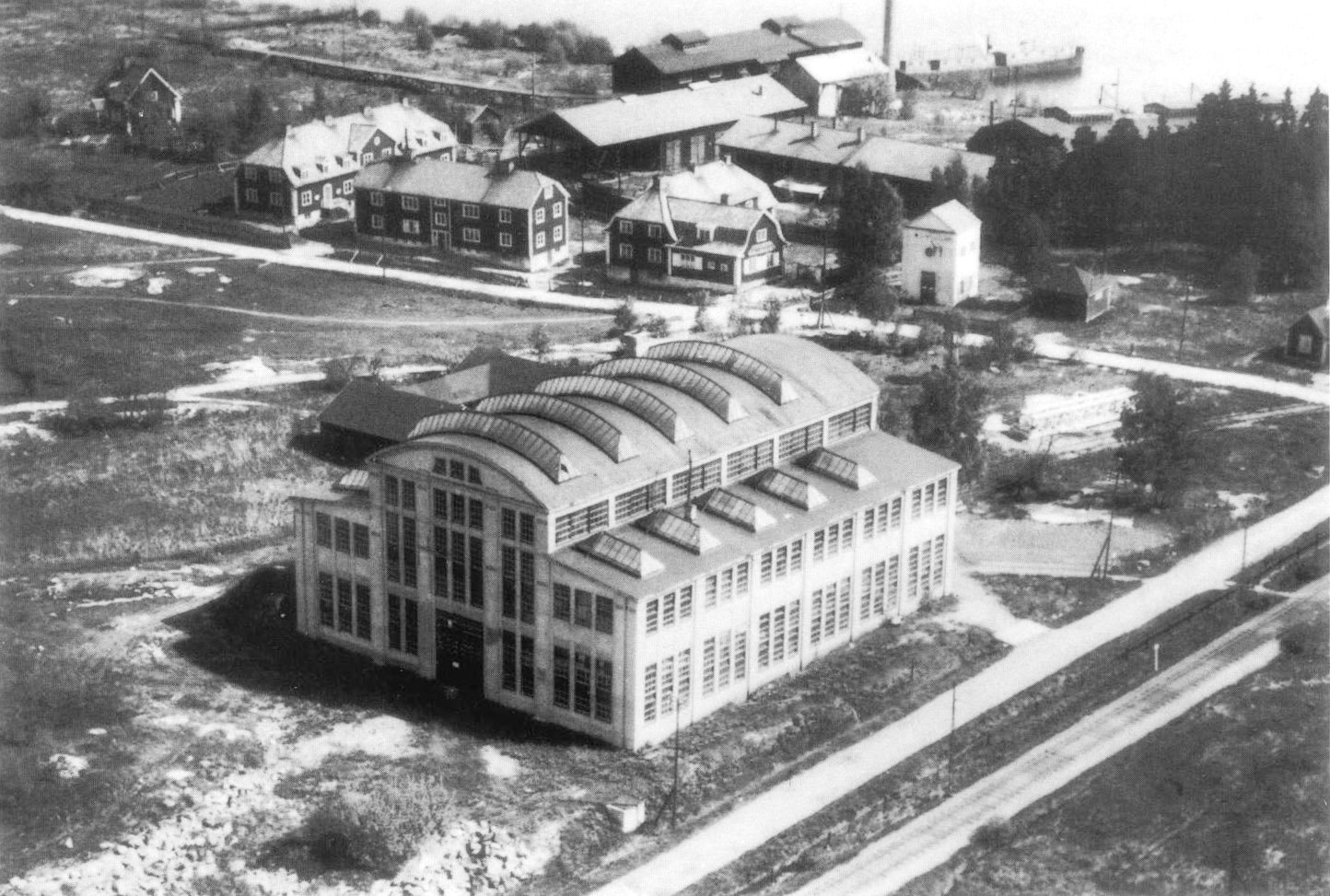
Factory in Gåshaga, Lidingö, Stockholm, for production of Ljungström locomotives, (1918)

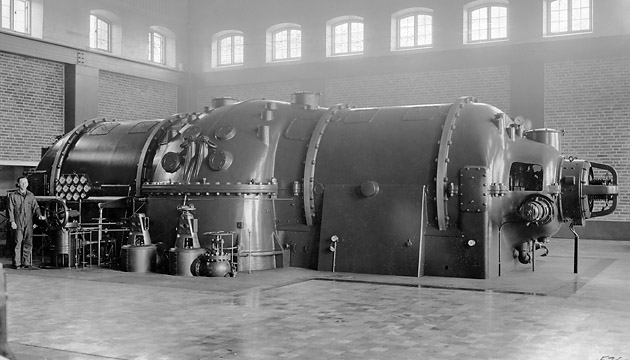
Ljungström 50 MW electric generator unit for power station in Västerås (1932)

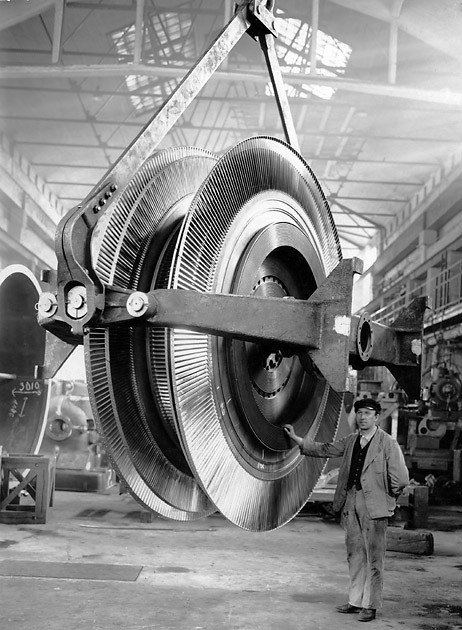
Turbine rotor of the same turbine (50 MW)

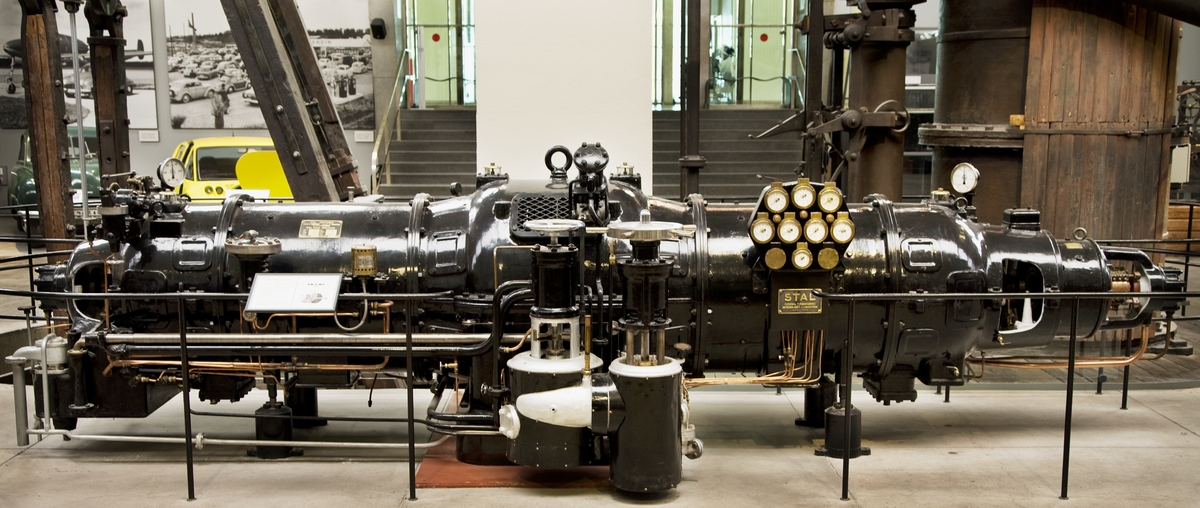
STAL counterpressure steam turbine of steel

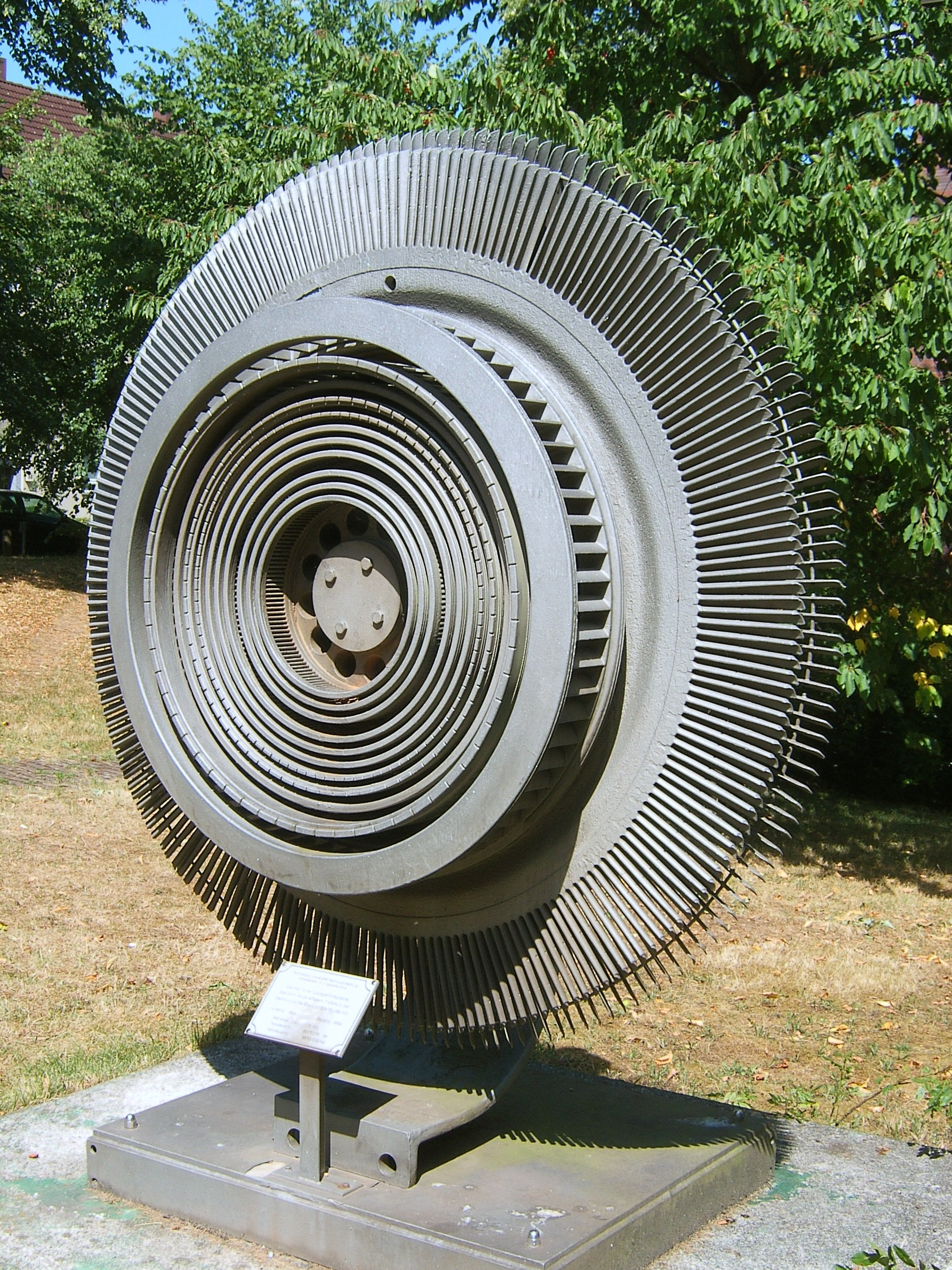
Rotor for a Ljungström turbine with internal radial and external axial blading

== See also ==
- STAL
- Brush Electrical Machines
- Gio. Ansaldo & C.

== Bibliography ==
- Sigvard Strandh: Die Maschine: Geschichte, Elemente, Funktion. Ein enzyklopädisches Sachbuch, Herder Verlag, 1980. ISBN 3-451-18873-2 (Ljungströmturbine, pp. 133–135, Svea-Bike, p. 220 and Fig. 221)
