= STAL =

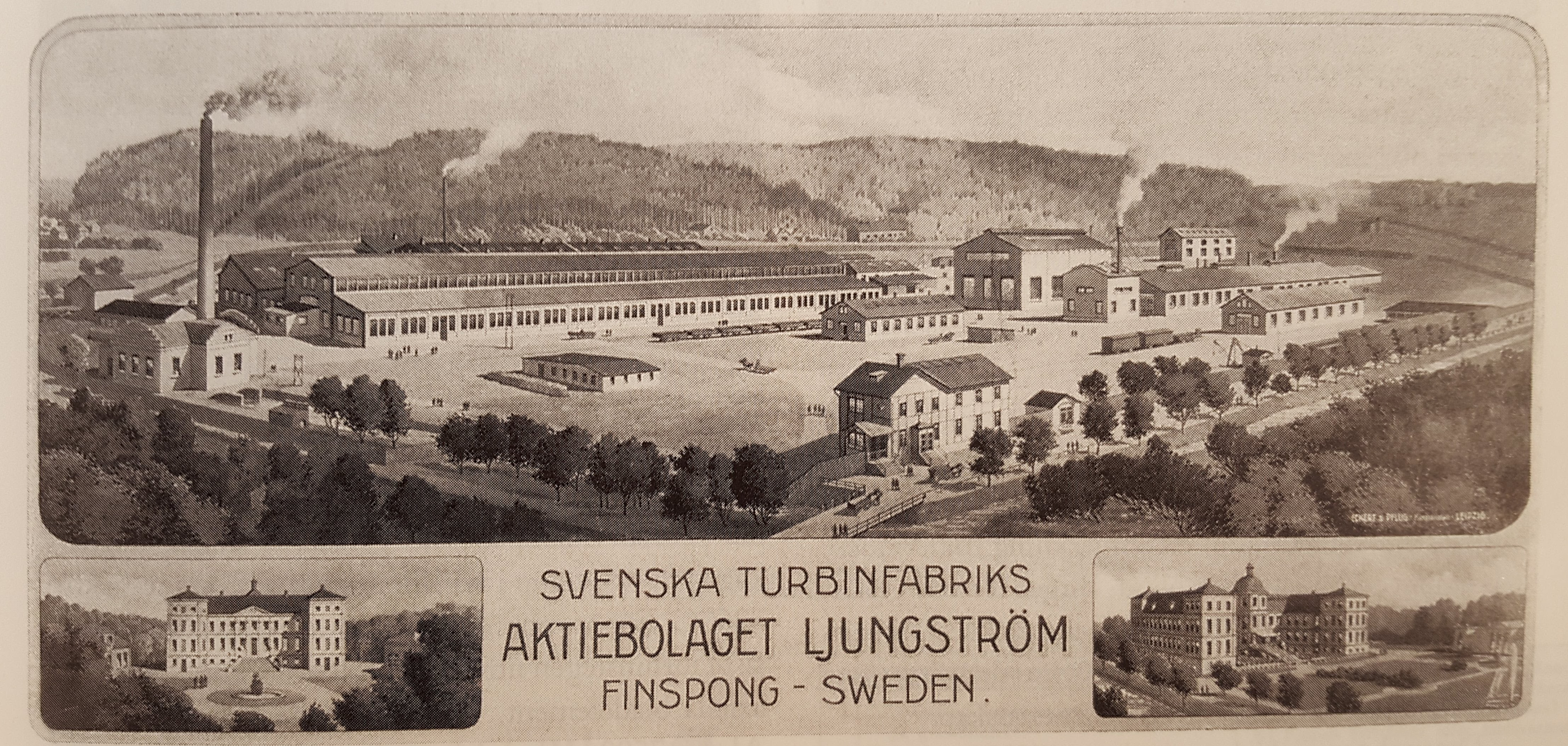
Ljungström Swedish Turbine Manufacturing Co. (Swedish: Svenska Turbinfabriks Aktiebolaget Ljungström, STAL) in Finspång, Östergötland, Sweden (1910s).

STAL (Svenska Turbinfabriks AB Ljungström; "Swedish Turbine Manufacturing Co.") was an industrial company established in 1913 in Finspång, Sweden, by the brothers Birger Ljungström, and Fredrik Ljungström, developing the Ljungström turbine.

In 1916, STAL became a subsidiary of ASEA. In 1959, the company was merged with AB de Laval Steam Turbine in Stockholm and formed Turbin AB de Laval Ljungström, which changed its name to STAL-LAVAL Turbin AB in 1962. After ASEA merged with Brown Boveri to ABB 1988, the name was changed to ABB STAL AB. This company later joined forces with Alstom. Ever since, the business is split between Alstom (Alstom Power Sweden AB) and Siemens (Siemens Industrial Turbomachinery AB).

== History ==
AB Ljungströms Ångturbin was formed in 1908 for the production of the Ljungström turbine (later called STAL turbine) and other inventions of the two brothers Birger Ljungström (1872–1948) and Fredrik Ljungström (1875–1964). The first Ljungström turbine was completed, and in 1912 the second copy was delivered to 7000 kW to England to supply London's trains with power. Manufacturing was originally placed at workshops at Lövholmen at Liljeholmen just outside central Stockholm.

Svenska Turbinfabriks AB Ljungström (STAL) was formed in 1913 to take over the manufacturing and sales right of Ljungström turbine. The production moved simultaneously to Finspång. The operations expanded rapidly and steam turbines for both industrial and marine purposes were exported to, among others, Japan, South Africa and Poland.

ASEA took over the majority of shares in STAL 1916, and in 1932, it delivered Northern Europe's largest power plant, a 50 MW STAL turbine, to the public Västerås steam power plant in Västerås. The same year was also saw the production of refrigeration from another of ASEA's subsidiaries, Luth & Roséns Elektriska AB in Stockholm. During the 1940s, STAL began to develop gas turbines for jet engines. Among other things, the idea was to manufacture combat engines for the Swedish Air Force, but when they preferred British manufacturers, STAL instead focused on stationary industrial gas turbines. The result was the GT-35 model, which in further developed form is still sold, now under the name SGT-500.

In 1959, the operations were merged with AB de Lavals Ångturbin. The new company name STAL-LAVAL Turbin AB came a few years later and the business was concentrated in Finspång.

== List of managing directors ==
STAL had the following CEOs:

- 1913–1916: Birger Ljungström
- 1917–1919: Ivar Hahne
- 1920–1940: Georg Leire
- 1941–1955: Erik David Lindblom
- 1955–1959 (1961): Curt Nicolin

== Gallery ==
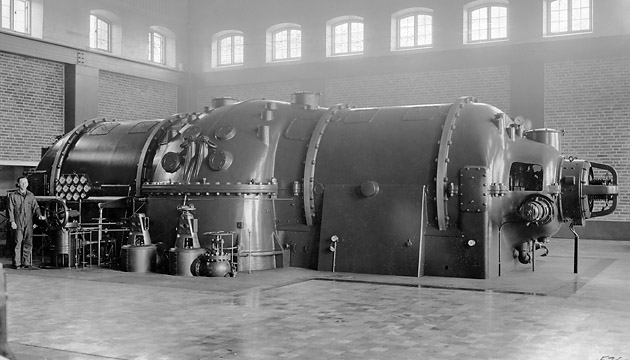
The Ljungström turbine with 50 MW electronical effect (G5 in sv:Västerås ångkraftverk).

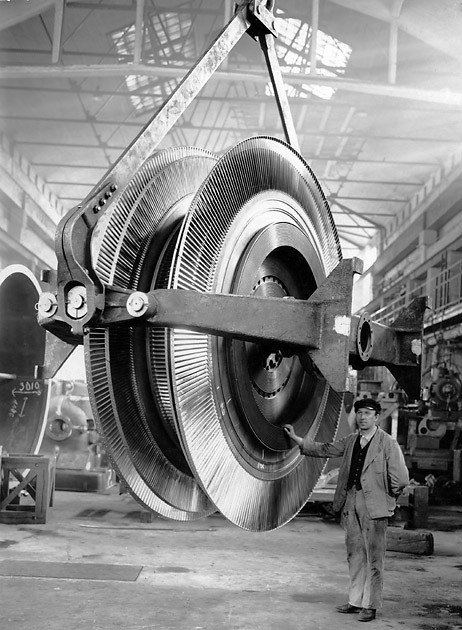
50 MW Ljungström steam turbine.

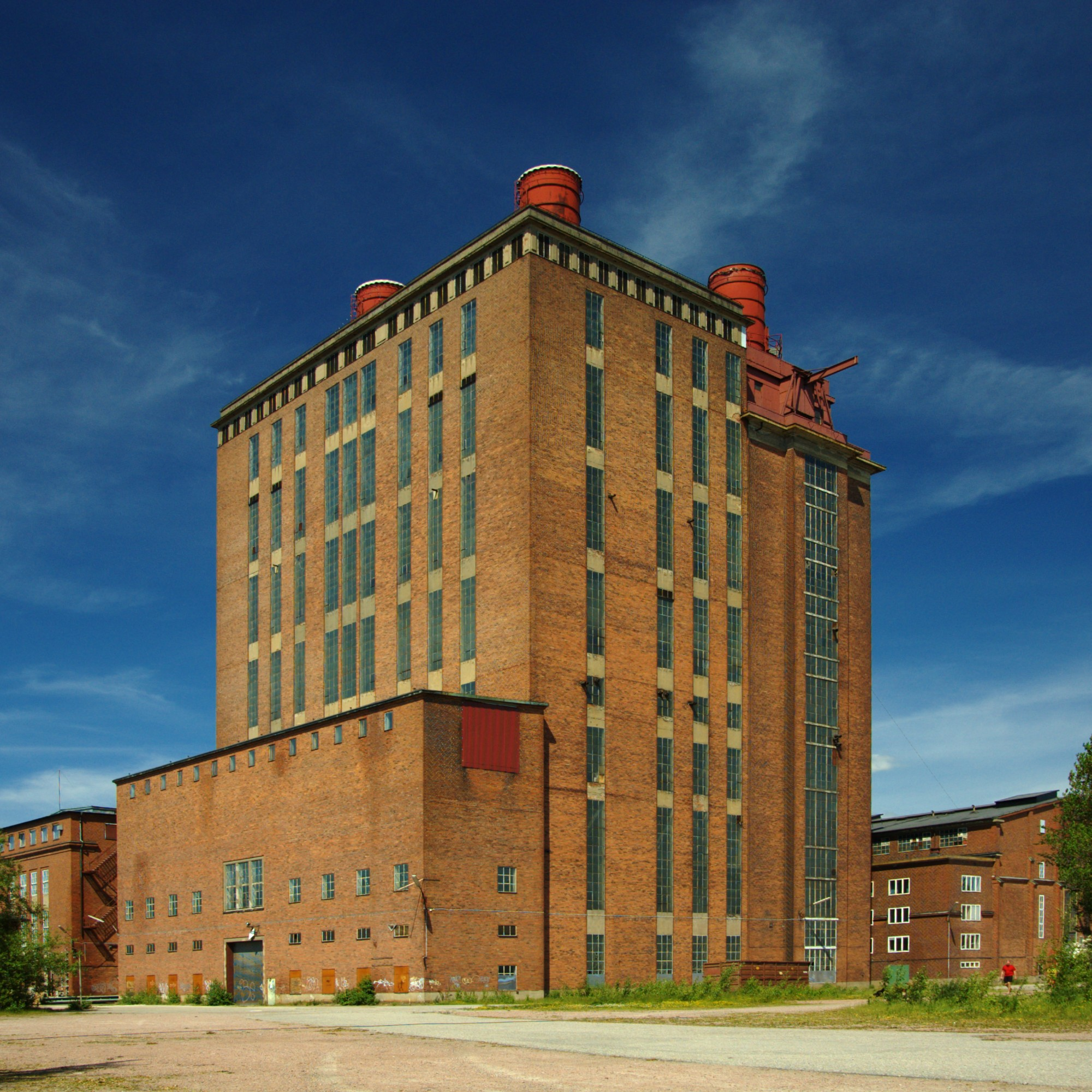
Västerås steam power plant, exteriors.

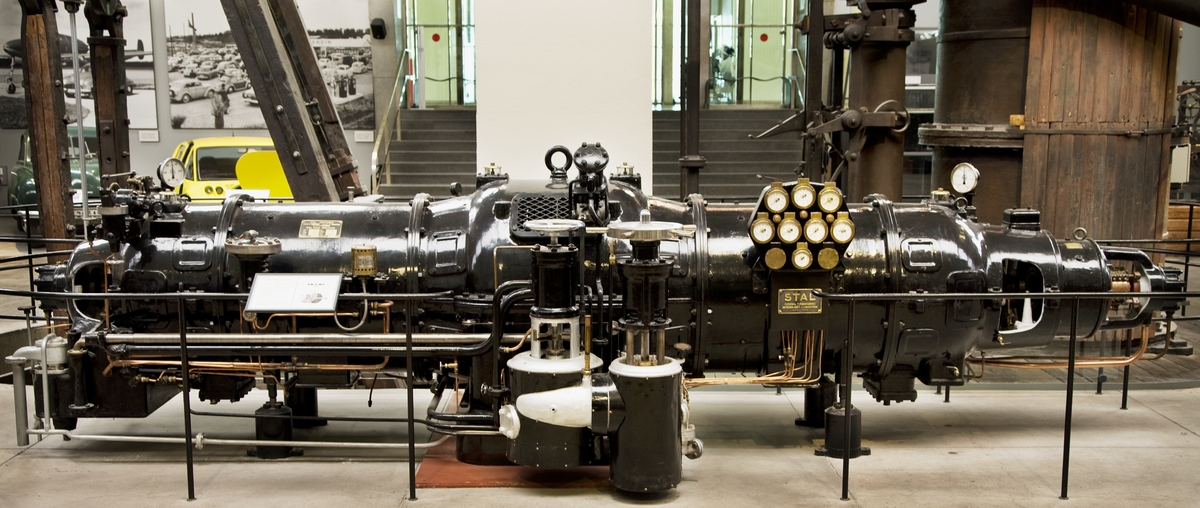
STAL turbine exhibited at the entrance of the Swedish National Museum of Science and Technology in Stockholm, Sweden.

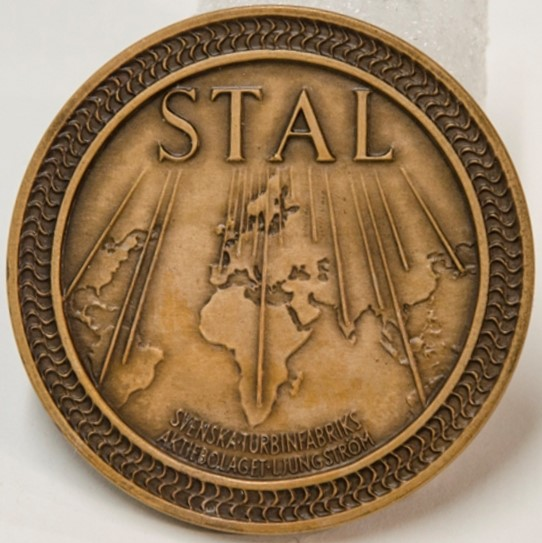
Plaquette in bronze depicting on one side Louis De Geer and Finspång Castle, on the other side STAL (Svenska Turbinfabriks Aktiebolaget Ljungström). Produced by AB Sporrong & Co. From the Swedish National Museum of Science and Technology.

== See also ==
- STAL Dovern
- STAL Glan
- STAL Skuten
