= Bagge =

Bagge is a family name of predominantly Scandinavian origin. It may refer to:

== Families ==
- Bagge family, Swedish family originating from Marstrand, Bohuslän, 16th century
- Bagge baronets, Baronetage of the United Kingdom, created in 1867

== Other ==
- Anders Bagge (born 1968), Swedish composer
- Charlotte Bagge Hansen (born 1969), Danish politician
- Gösta Bagge (1882–1951), Swedish economist and politician
- Peter Bagge (born 1957), American cartoonist
- Selmar Bagge (1823–1896), German composer and music journalist
- Lotte Bagge (born 1968), Danish football player
