= Saab 92 =

Car model

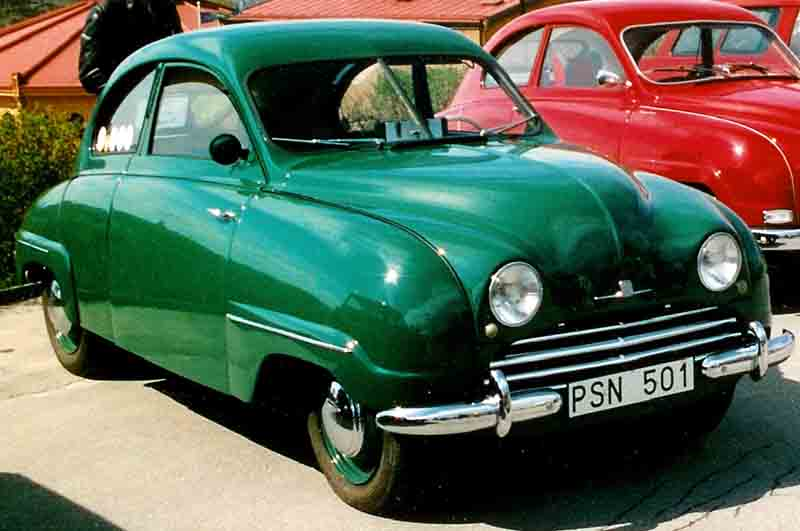
- 1951 Saab 92 De Luxe

Overview
- Manufacturer: Saab Automobile
- Production: 1949–1957
- Assembly: Sweden: Trollhättan (Trollhättan Assembly)
- Designer: Sixten Sason

Body and chassis
- Class: Small family car (C)
- Body style: 2-door coupé
- Layout: Transverse front-engine, front-wheel drive

Powertrain
- Engine: 764 cc two-stroke I2 (gasoline)
- Transmission: 3-speed manual

Dimensions
- Wheelbase: 2,470 mm (97.2 in)
- Length: 3,950 mm (155.5 in)
- Width: 1,620 mm (63.8 in)
- Height: 1,430–1,450 mm (56.3–57.1 in)

Chronology
- Predecessor: Ursaab
- Successor: Saab 93

The Saab 92 was the first production car from Saab. The design was very aerodynamic for its time, with a drag coefficient (c_{x} or c_{w}) of 0.30. The entire body was stamped out of one piece of sheet metal and then cut to accommodate doors and windows. Full-scale production started December 12, 1949, based on the prototype Ursaab. All of them were of the Deluxe version. A standard version was advertised, but nobody was interested in buying it so no standard versions were produced.

The engine was a transversely-mounted, water-cooled two-cylinder, two-stroke 764 cc displacement, 25 hp (19 kW) engine based on a DKW design, giving a top speed of 105 km/h (65 mph). The transmission had three gears, the first unsynchronised. In order to overcome the problems of oil starvation during overrun (engine braking) for the two-stroke engine, a freewheel device was fitted. The suspension was by torsion bars.

All early Saab 92s were painted in a dark green colour similar to British racing green. According to some sources, Saab had a surplus of green paint from wartime production of airplanes; "All the cars were painted bottle green, a colour that became something of a trade mark for Saab cars. The underlying reason was that the armed forces had bought large quantities of a green cellulose paint for camouflage painting. However, the paint did not suit the terrain and the entire consignment of paint was sold off. Saab bought it and that was why both the aircraft and cars ended up green."

A total of 700 1950 models were made. In 1951, German VDO instruments replaced the originally-fitted American Stewart-Warner components.

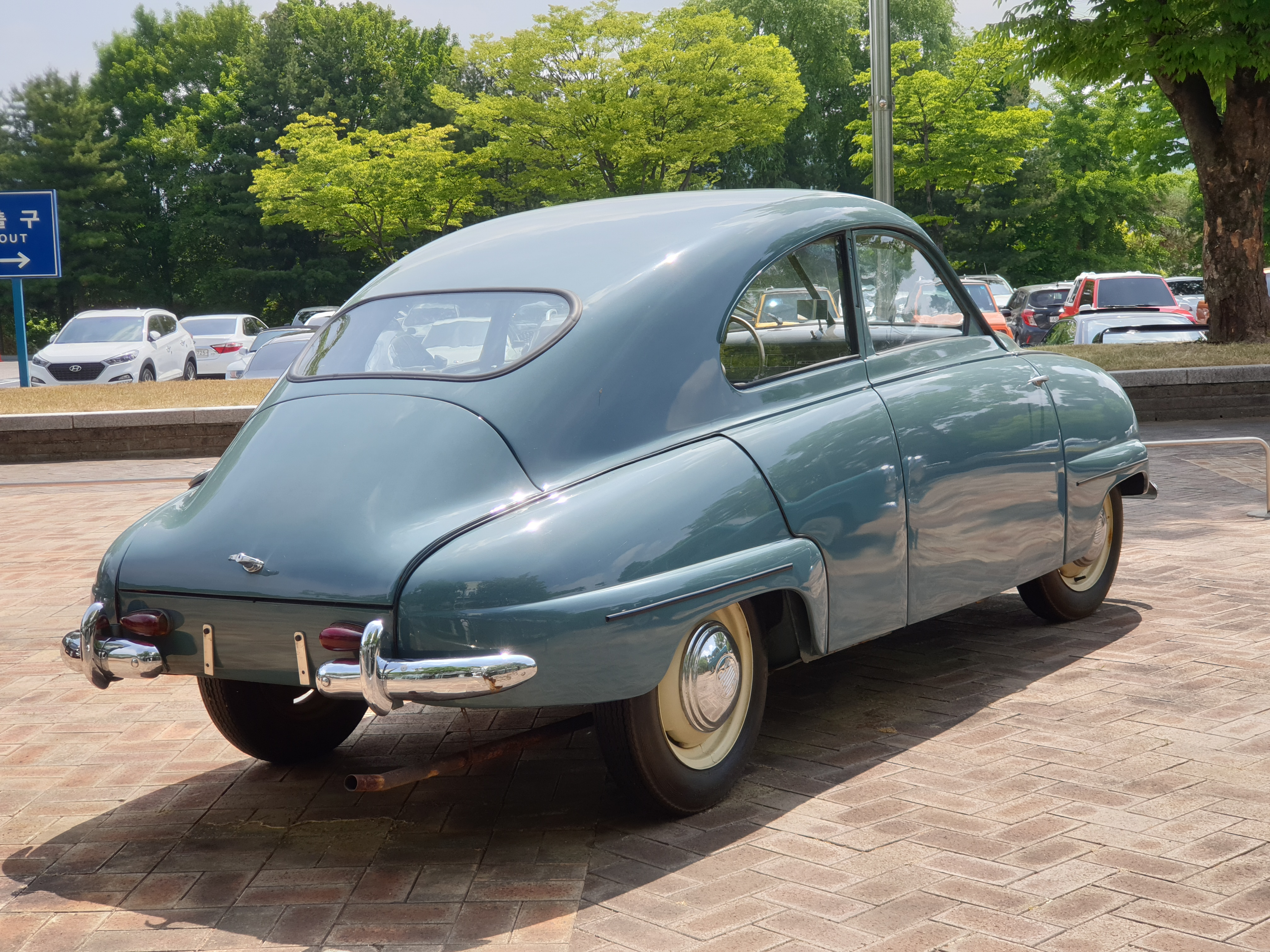
1953 Saab 92B rear 3/4 view

In 1953, the 92B arrived with a much larger rear window and larger luggage space (with an opening lid). It was now available in grey, blue-grey, black and green. In 1954, the Saab 92 got the new Solex 32BI carburetor and a new ignition coil producing 28 hp (21 kW). The US headlights were replaced with Hella units. Another novelty was that a textile roof (semi-cab or cabrio coach) was offered as an option. The colour maroon was also introduced this year. In 1955, it acquired an electric fuel pump and square tail lights installed in the rear fenders. The colours were grey, maroon and a new color, moss green.

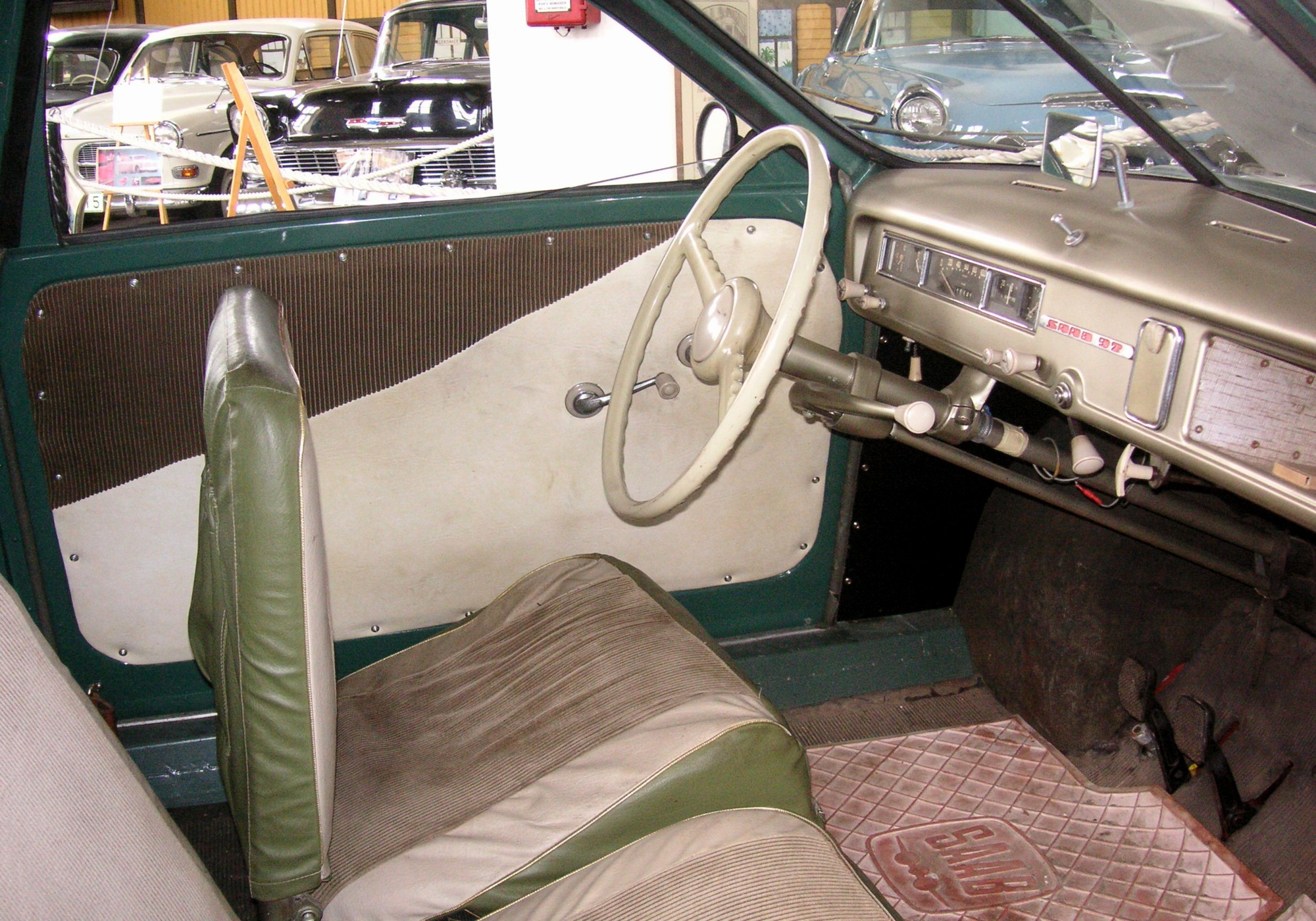
1951 Saab 92 interior

The English aviation test pilot Bob Moore, who had helped to develop the Saab Tunnan (J29) jet aircraft, brought a 1955 Saab 92B back to England, when he returned, later to become the first managing director of Saab GB Ltd. This was reputedly the first-ever Saab car imported to the UK.

The Saab 93 was introduced in December 1955, but both the 92B and 93 were produced at the same time, for a while. The last 92 was assembled in late 1956–early 1957. Two new colours, grey-green and beige, were available. A total of 20,128 Saab 92s were made.

The Saab 92 appears on a Swedish postage stamp.

== Motorsport ==
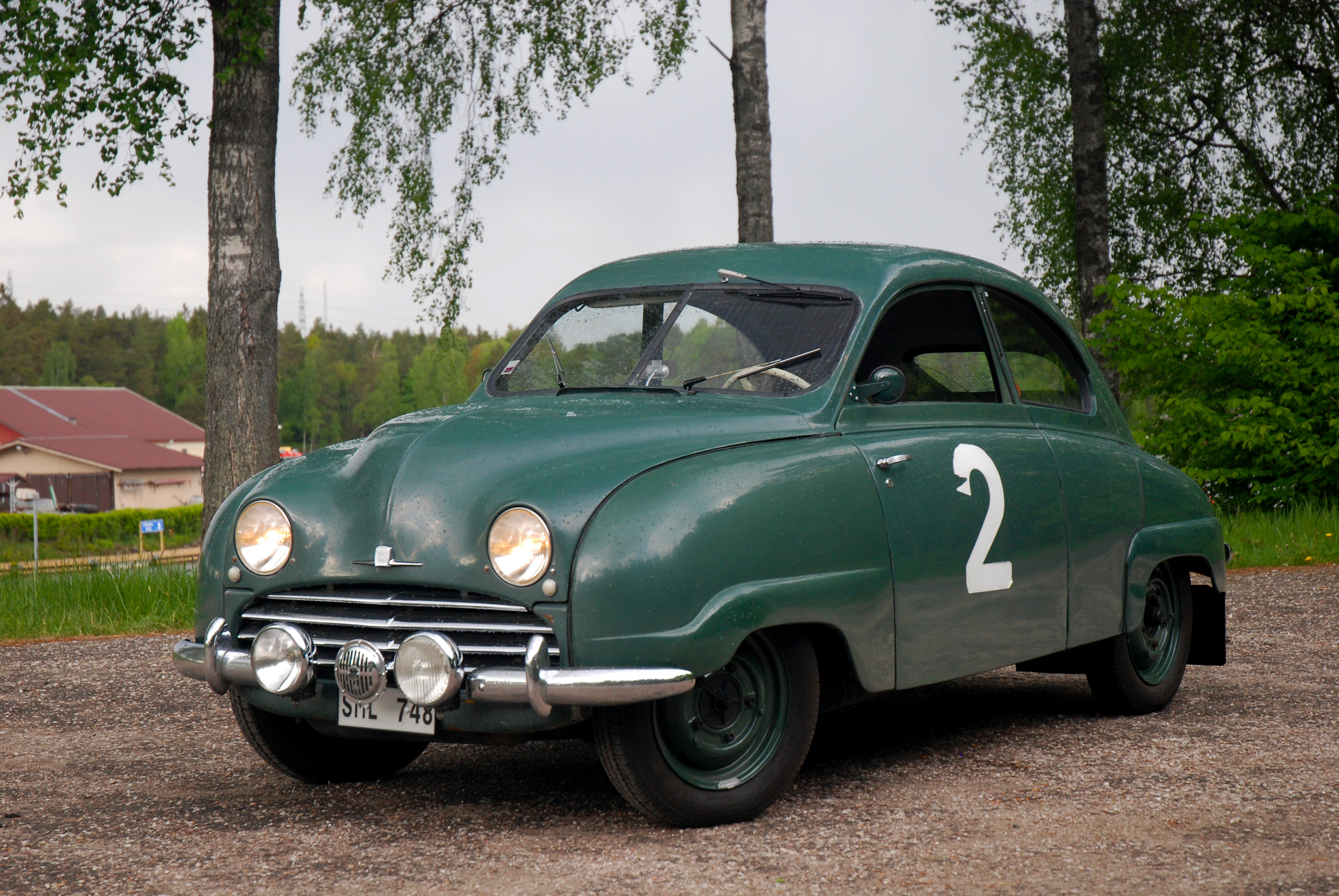
A replica of Greta Molander's Saab 92 rally car

Saab's rally history already started two weeks after the 92 was released, when Saab's head engineer Rolf Mellde entered the Swedish Rally and came second in his class.

In 1952, Greta Molander won the 'Coupe des Dames' of the Monte Carlo Rally in a 92, tuned to 35 hp (26 kW).
