= Olof Ljungström =

Swedish engineer

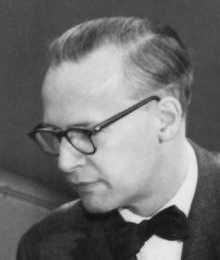
Olof Ljungström aerodynamic engineer Saab Stanford Caltech, 1918–2013

Gustaf Olof "Olle" Ljungström (1918–2013) was a Swedish engineer. He was a visiting professor in aircraft design at Stanford University and the California Institute of Technology in the United States.

== Biography ==
Olof Ljungström was born in 1918 as the son of Fredrik Ljungström and Signe (née Söderberg). He studied at Whitlockska samskolan, and studied aeronautics at the Royal Institute of Technology in Stockholm. He undertook military service as an automotive engineer in the Swedish Air Force in 1939 and 1940. He acquired a Ph.D. in transportation and aviation technology at the Royal Institute of Technology in 1973.

Ljungström made contributions as an engineer in both his family businesses, notably in shale oil extraction, and beyond. He was recruited for the aircraft development at Saab. As a technical engineer, he worked with models from Saab 17 and Saab 29 Tunnan to Saab 35 Draken, the latter which was originally due to employ the jet engine STAL Dovern. He also spearheaded the development of the hovercraft Saab 401 for the Swedish Navy during the 1960s.

Due to his wide knowledge in the field, he was appointed visiting professor in aircraft design at Stanford University 1966-1967 and the California Institute of Technology 1968, both in the United States.

Furthermore, Ljungström was an international pioneer in wind power. He initiated the governmental project of wind power in Sweden at the National Swedish Board for Technical Development (Styrelsen för teknisk utveckling) in 1974.

Ljungström has contributed as technical writer and editor in Teknisk Tidskrift (1960-1975), among other publications. Having worked close to his father Fredrik Ljungström, he wrote an extensive biography on him, Fredrik Ljungström 1875-1964 - Uppfinnare och inspiratör, in 1999.

== Distinctions ==
- Sweden: Honorary member of the Swedish Society of Aeronautics and Astronautics
