= 1819 =

1819 in various calendars
- Gregorian calendar: 1819; MDCCCXIX
- Ab urbe condita: 2572
- Armenian calendar: 1268; ԹՎ ՌՄԿԸ
- Assyrian calendar: 6569
- Balinese saka calendar: 1740–1741
- Bengali calendar: 1225–1226
- Berber calendar: 2769
- British Regnal year: 59 Geo. 3 – 60 Geo. 3
- Buddhist calendar: 2363
- Burmese calendar: 1181
- Byzantine calendar: 7327–7328
- Chinese calendar: 戊寅年 (Earth Tiger); 4516 or 4309 — to — 己卯年 (Earth Rabbit); 4517 or 4310
- Coptic calendar: 1535–1536
- Discordian calendar: 2985
- Ethiopian calendar: 1811–1812
- Hebrew calendar: 5579–5580
- Hindu calendars
- Vikram Samvat: 1875–1876
- Shaka Samvat: 1740–1741
- Kali Yuga: 4919–4920
- Holocene calendar: 11819
- Igbo calendar: 819–820
- Iranian calendar: 1197–1198
- Islamic calendar: 1234–1235
- Japanese calendar: Bunsei 2 (文政２年)
- Javanese calendar: 1746–1747
- Julian calendar: Gregorian minus 12 days
- Korean calendar: 4152
- Minguo calendar: 93 before ROC 民前93年
- Nanakshahi calendar: 351
- Thai solar calendar: 2361–2362
- Tibetan calendar: ས་ཕོ་སྟག་ལོ་ (male Earth-Tiger); 1945 or 1564 or 792 — to — ས་མོ་ཡོས་ལོ་ (female Earth-Hare); 1946 or 1565 or 793

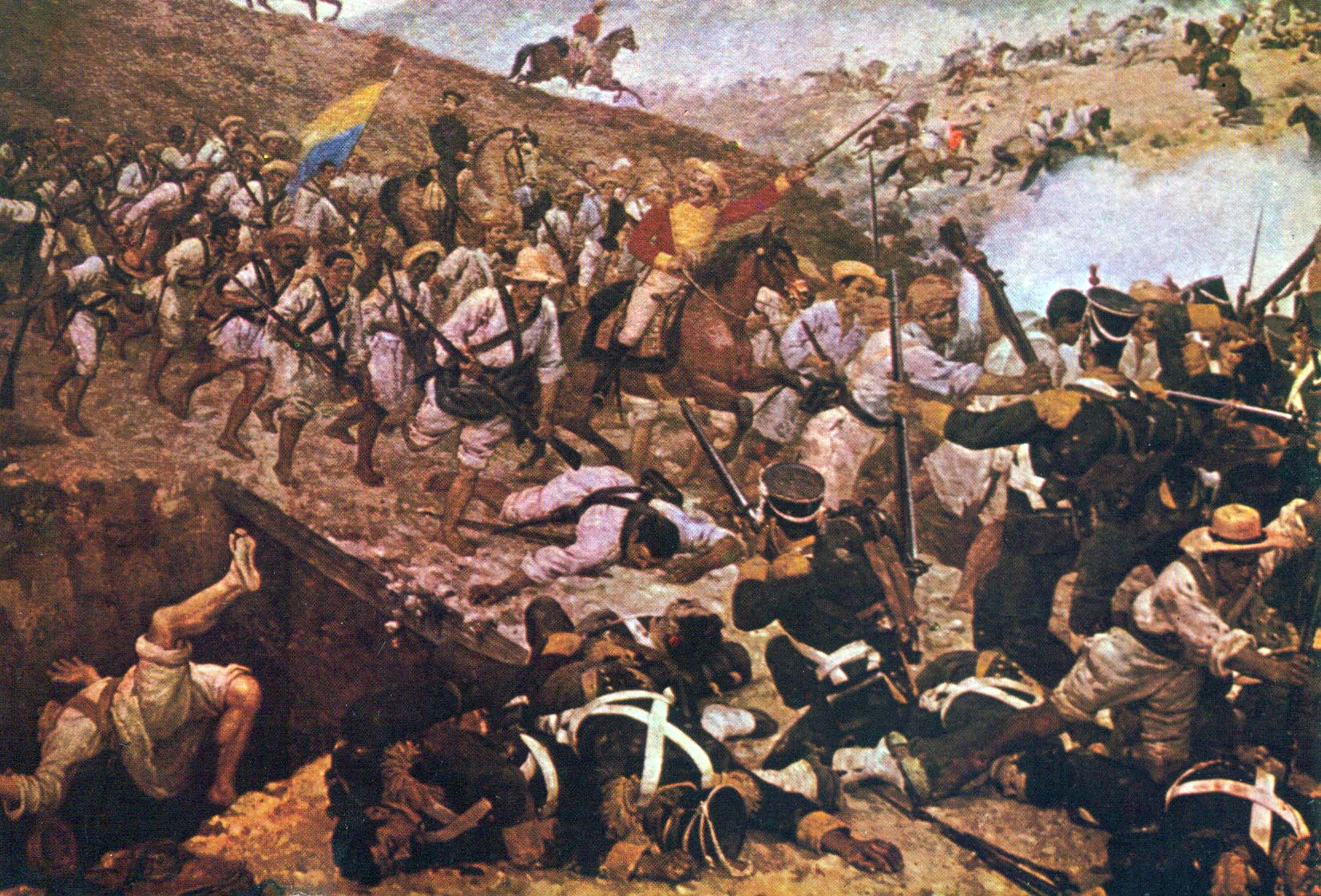
August 7: General Simon Bolivar leads Colombian nationalists to victory over Spain in the decisive Battle of Boyacá.

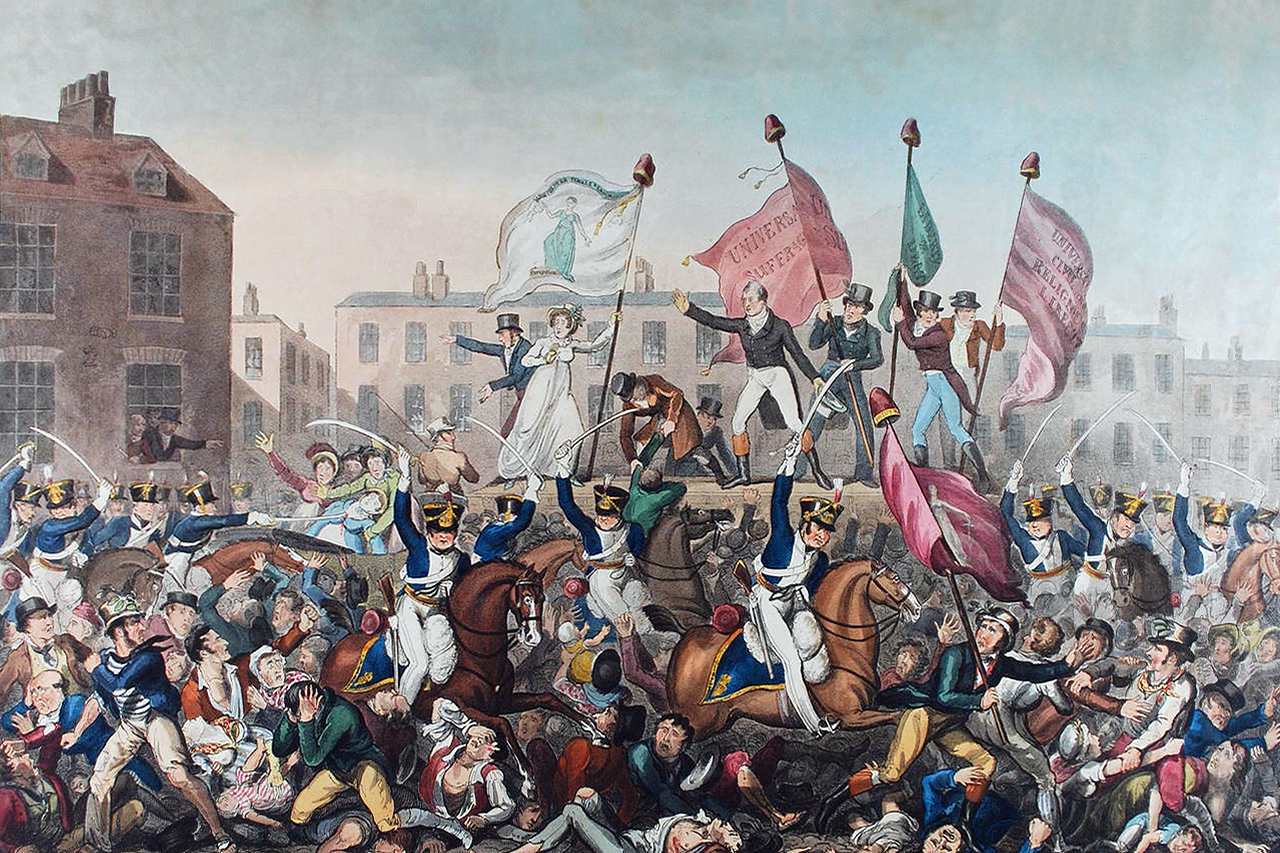
August 16: At least 600 people are injured, 15 of them fatally, in the Peterloo Massacre of protesters in England.

1819 (MDCCCXIX) was a common year starting on Friday of the Gregorian calendar and a common year starting on Wednesday of the Julian calendar, the 1819th year of the Common Era (CE) and Anno Domini (AD) designations, the 819th year of the 2nd millennium, the 19th year of the 19th century, and the 10th and last year of the 1810s decade. As of the start of 1819, the Gregorian calendar was 12 days ahead of the Julian calendar, which remained in localized use until 1923.

== Events ==
=== January–March ===
- January 2 – The Panic of 1819, the first major peacetime financial crisis in the United States, begins.
- January 25 – Thomas Jefferson founds the University of Virginia.
- January 29 – Sir Stamford Raffles lands on the island of Singapore.
- February 6 – The Treaty of Singapore, is signed between Hussein Shah of Johor and Sir Stamford Raffles of Britain, to create a trading settlement in Singapore.
- February 15 – The United States House of Representatives agrees to the Tallmadge Amendment, barring slaves from the new state of Missouri (the opening vote in a controversy that leads to the Missouri Compromise).
- February 19 – Captain William Smith sights Williams Point, the northeast extremity of Livingston Island in the South Shetlands, the first land discovered south of latitude 60° S.
- February 22 – Adams–Onís Treaty: Agreement is reached for Spain to cede Florida (already under USA's domination) to the United States in exchange for renunciation of American claims on Texas arising from the Louisiana Purchase, American payment of $5 million to settle citizens' claims regarding Florida, and definition of international borders. Following ratification, the treaty takes effect in 1821.
- March 23 – In Mannheim, Duchy of Baden, German dramatist August von Kotzebue is assassinated by Karl Ludwig Sand.

=== April–June ===
- April 6–June 21 – The French slave ship Le Rodeur sails from Bonny in West Africa to Guadeloupe in the West Indies. In the course of the transatlantic voyage many onboard become blind, and 30 slaves are thrown overboard as a consequence.
- April 7 (N.S.) (March 26 O.S.) – The Governorate of Livonia of the Russian Empire emancipates its peasants from serfdom.
- April 21 – In a period of about a month starting today during his "Living Year", English poet John Keats writes "La Belle Dame sans Merci" and most of his major odes.
- May 22
  - The SS Savannah leaves port at Savannah, Georgia, on a voyage to become the first steamship to cross the Atlantic Ocean. The ship arrives at Liverpool, England, nearly a month later, on June 20, although only a fraction of the trip is made under steam.
  - The city of Memphis, Tennessee, is founded.
- June 16 – The Rann of Kutch earthquake, estimated at at least 7.7 M_{w} kills at least 1,543 people in India in what is now the state of Gujarat at the Arabian Sea, causing an 80–150 km (50–93 mi) stretch of land to be raised as much as 6 m (20 ft) and creating a natural dam, the Allahbund.

=== July–September ===
- July 1 – German astronomer Johann Georg Tralles discovers what will be called the Great Comet of 1819.
- July 21 – Explorer William Parry, sailing in the Arctic in a quest for the Northwest Passage through North America, guides the ships HMS Hecla and HMS Griper through an iceberg-laden passage that will later be named the Parry Channel.
- July 24 – A cabinet meeting is convened by British Prime Minister Lord Liverpool to discuss a report of an adulterous affair involving the wife of George, Prince of Wales, the regent for his ailing father King George III. Despite reports that Princess Caroline is involved with her servant, Bartolomeo Pergami, the cabinet concludes that the trial of Caroline for adultery would be an embarrassment to the nation.
- August 2 – The first Hep-Hep riots, communal pogroms against Ashkenazi Jews in the German Federation begin at Würzburg in Bavaria. They continue until October with many Jews killed.
- August 6 – Norwich University is founded by Captain Alden Partridge in Vermont as the first private military school in the United States.
- August 7 – Battle of Boyacá: Simón Bolívar is victorious over the Royalist Army in Colombia. Colombia acquires its definitive independence from Spanish rule.
- August 16 – Peterloo Massacre: A yeomanry unit charges into a crowd of radical protesters in Manchester, England, resulting in 15 deaths and over 600 injuries.
- August 25 – Salon of 1819 opens in Paris. Amongst the exhibits is The Raft of the Medusa.
- September 20 – The Carlsbad Decrees are issued throughout the German Confederation in response to the March assassination of August von Kotzebue, suppressing liberal and nationalist views.

=== October–December ===
- October 13 – A treaty is entered between the Raja of Cutch Deshalji II, and East India Company, placing the Cutch State under Company rule.
- October 15 – Desolation Island, in the South Shetland Islands of the Antarctic, is discovered by Captain William Smith.
- November 2 – Bagyidaw is crowned as Emperor of Burma, at the imperial capital of Inwa.
- November 3 – The USS Congress becomes the first American warship to visit China, landing at Lintin Island, off of the coast of Canton.
- November 19 – The Museo del Prado opens in Madrid. Initially, it has 311 significant paintings.
- November 25 – A British expeditionary force reaches Ras Al Khaimah in the Persian Gulf, preparatory to the bombardment and invasion of the town, which led to the signing of the General Maritime Treaty of 1820 between the British and what were to become known as the Trucial States.
- December 14 – Alabama is admitted as the 22nd U.S. state.
- December 17
  - The Republic of Gran Colombia is formally established, with Simón Bolívar as its first president.
  - The new astronomical observatory of Capodimonte in Naples starts operating. The astronomer Carlo Brioschi made the first observation by measuring the position of ⍺ Cassiopeiae.

=== Date unknown ===
- Early – Denis Johnson of London markets his "pedestrian curricle", a form of dandy horse, velocipede or kick scooter.
- The city of Fernandina de Jagua (later Cienfuegos) is founded in Cuba.
- A British Arctic expedition under William Parry, comprising HMS Hecla and HMS Griper, reaches longitude 112°51' W in the Northwest Passage, the furthest west which will be attained by any single-season voyage for 150 years.
- The United States African Slave Trade Patrol is founded to stop the slave trade on the coast of West Africa.

== Births ==
=== January–June ===
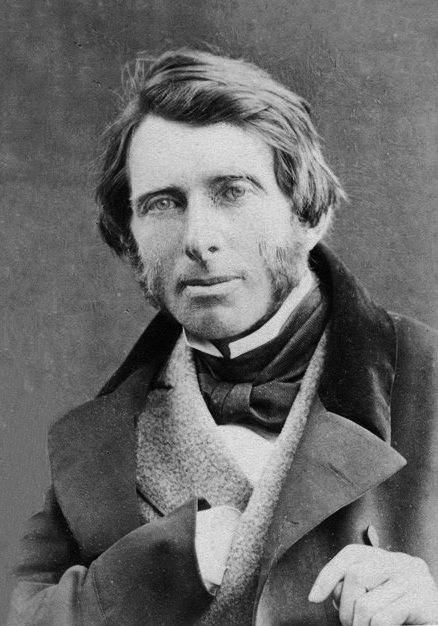
John Ruskin

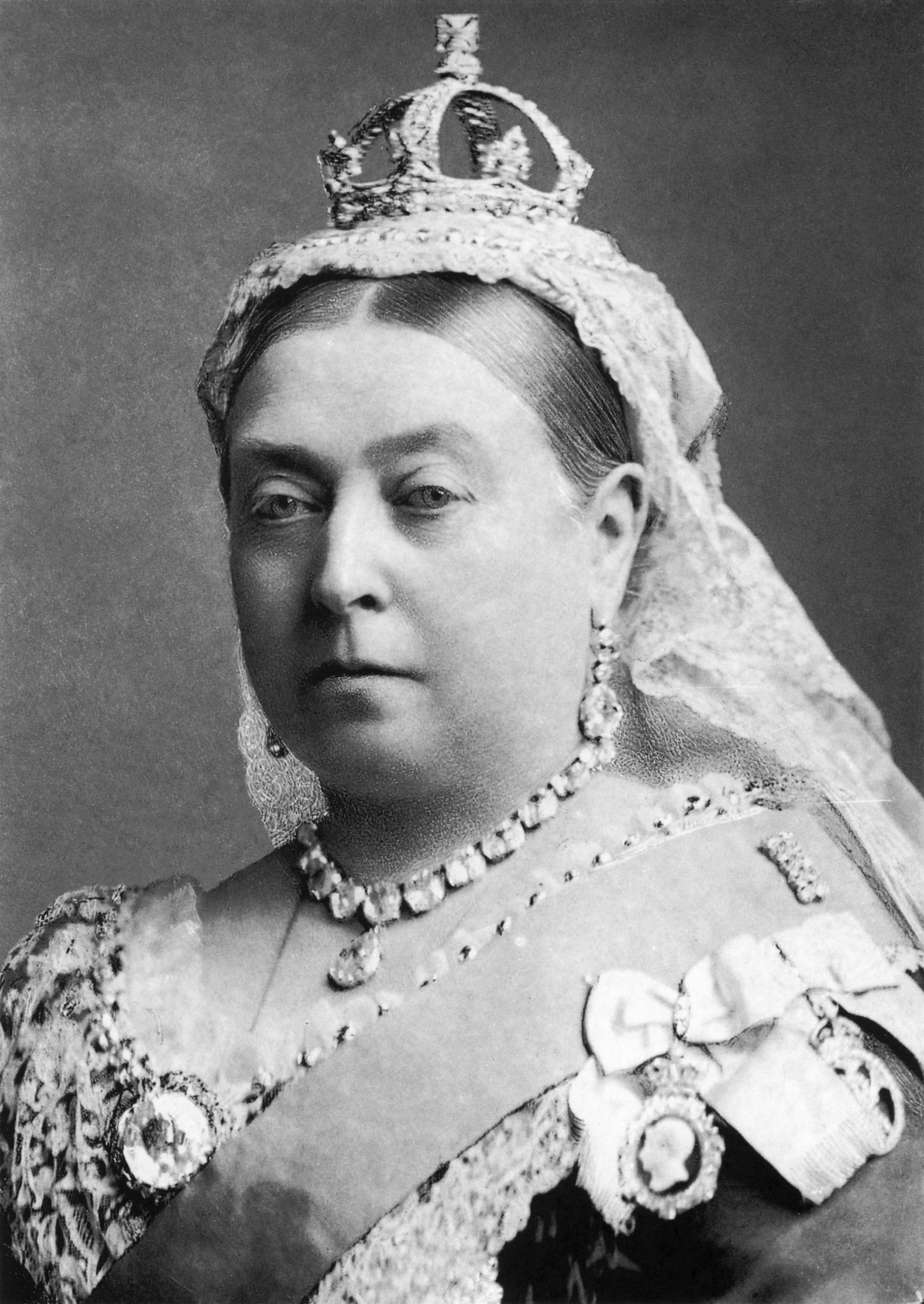
Queen Victoria

Jacques Offenbach

- January 1 – Arthur Hugh Clough, English poet (d. 1861)
- January 6 – Baldassare Verazzi, Italian painter (d. 1886)
- January 7 – Theresa Pulszky, European author (d. 1866)
- January 9 – William Powell Frith, English painter (d. 1909)
- February 8
  - Sidonija Rubido, Croatian singer (d. 1884)
  - John Ruskin, English writer, artist, and social critic (d. 1900)
- February 11 – Samuel Parkman Tuckerman, American composer (d. 1890)
- February 14 – Christopher Latham Sholes, American inventor (d. 1890)
- February 20 – Alfred Escher, Swiss politician, railroad entrepreneur (d. 1882)
- February 22 – James Russell Lowell, American poet, essayist (d. 1891)
- March 3 – Gustave de Molinari, Belgian economist (d. 1912)
- March 14 – Erik Edlund, Swedish physicist, meteorologist (d. 1888)
- March 26 – Louise Otto-Peters, German women's rights movement activist (d. 1895)
- March 31 – Chlodwig, Prince of Hohenlohe-Schillingsfürst, Chancellor of Germany (d. 1901)
- April 4 – Queen Maria II of Portugal (d. 1853)
- April 11 – Charles Hallé, German pianist, conductor (d. 1895)
- April 18
  - Carlos Manuel de Céspedes, Cuban revolutionary hero (d. 1874)
  - Franz von Suppé, Austrian composer (d. 1895)
- April 23 – Edward Stafford, Scottish-New Zealand educator and politician, 3rd Prime Minister of New Zealand (d. 1901)
- April 28 – Ezra Abbot, American Biblical scholar (d. 1884)
- May 5 – Stanisław Moniuszko, Polish composer (d. 1872)
- May 24 – Queen Victoria of the United Kingdom (d. 1901)
- May 27
  - George V of Hanover (d. 1878)
  - Julia Ward Howe, American abolitionist and poet (d. 1910)
- May 31
  - Walt Whitman, American poet (d. 1892)
  - William Worrall Mayo, English-American physician, chemist (d. 1911)
- June 5 – John Couch Adams, English astronomer (d. 1892)
- June 10 – Gustave Courbet, French painter (d. 1877)
- June 12 – Charles Kingsley, English clergyman, historian, and novelist (d. 1875)
- June 20 – Jacques Offenbach, German-born French composer (d. 1880)
- June 29 – Nicolae Bălcescu, Wallachian revolutionary (d. 1852)

=== July–December ===
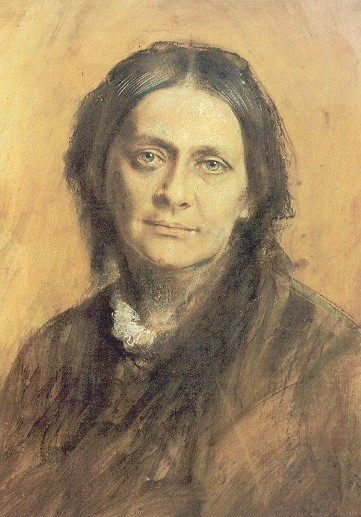
Clara Schumann

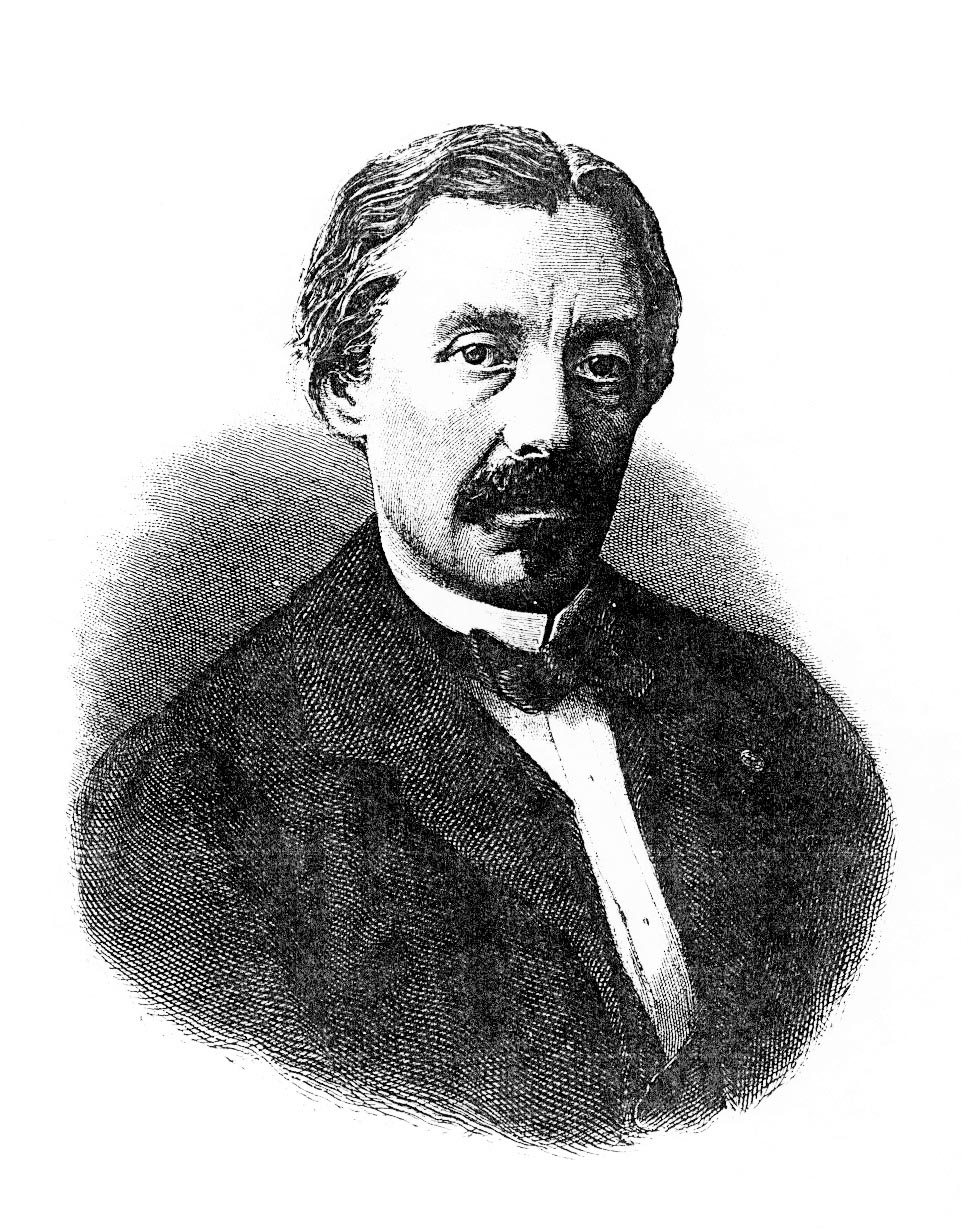
Léon Foucault

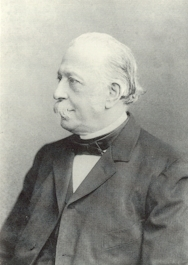
Theodor Fontane

- July 8 – Francis Leopold McClintock, Irish explorer and admiral in British Royal Navy (d. 1907)
- July 9 – Elias Howe, American inventor, sewing machine pioneer (d. 1867)
- July 19 – Gottfried Keller, Swiss writer (d. 1890)
- July 26 – Justin Holland, American musician, civil rights activist (d. 1887)
- August 1
  - Richard Dadd, British painter (d. 1886)
  - Herman Melville, American novelist (d. 1891)
- August 7 – Ioan Emanoil Florescu, Romanian general and politician, two-time Prime Minister of Romania (d. 1893)
- August 9 – William Thomas Green Morton, American dentist who first administered ether (d.1868)
- August 13 – Sir George Gabriel Stokes, Irish mathematician, physicist (d. 1903)
- August 19 – Julius van Zuylen van Nijevelt, Prime Minister of the Netherlands (d. 1894)
- August 25 – Allan Pinkerton, American detective (d. 1884)
- August 26
  - Prince Albert of Saxe-Coburg and Gotha, Consort to Queen Victoria (d. 1861)
  - Lawrence Dudley Bailey, American abolitionist and jurist who served on the Kansas Supreme Court from 1861 to 1869 (d. 1891)
- September 13 – Clara Schumann, German composer, pianist (d. 1896)
- September 17 – Marthinus Wessel Pretorius, 1st President of the South African Republic (d. 1901)
- September 18 – Léon Foucault, French physicist (d. 1868)
- September 20 – Théodore Chassériau, French painter (d. 1856)
- September 22 – Wilhelm Wattenbach, German historian (d. 1897)
- September 23 – Hippolyte Fizeau, French physicist (d. 1896)
- September 26 – Edward Watkin, English railway pioneer, politician (d. 1901)
- September 28 – Narcís Monturiol, Catalan intellectual, artist and engineer (d. 1885)
- October 2 – Théonie Rivière Mignot, American restaurateur and businesswoman (d. 1875)
- October 16 – Austin F. Pike, American politician from New Hampshire (d. 1886)
- October 20 – The Báb, Persian founder of the Bábi Faith (d. 1850)
- November 4 – Christopher Raymond Perry Rodgers, American admiral (d. 1892)
- November 9 – Annibale de Gasparis, Italian astronomer (d. 1892)
- November 22 – George Eliot, British novelist (d. 1880)
- November 24 – John Cummings Howell, United States Navy admiral (d. 1892)
- December 10 – Felice Orsini, Italian revolutionary (d. 1858)
- December 29 – Carl Siegmund Franz Credé, German gynecologist, obstetrician (d. 1892)
- December 30 – Theodor Fontane, German writer (d. 1898)

=== Date unknown ===
- Alexandru G. Golescu, 11th Prime Minister of Romania (d. 1881)
- Mary Jane Richardson Jones, American abolitionist and suffragist (d. 1909)

== Deaths ==
=== January–June ===
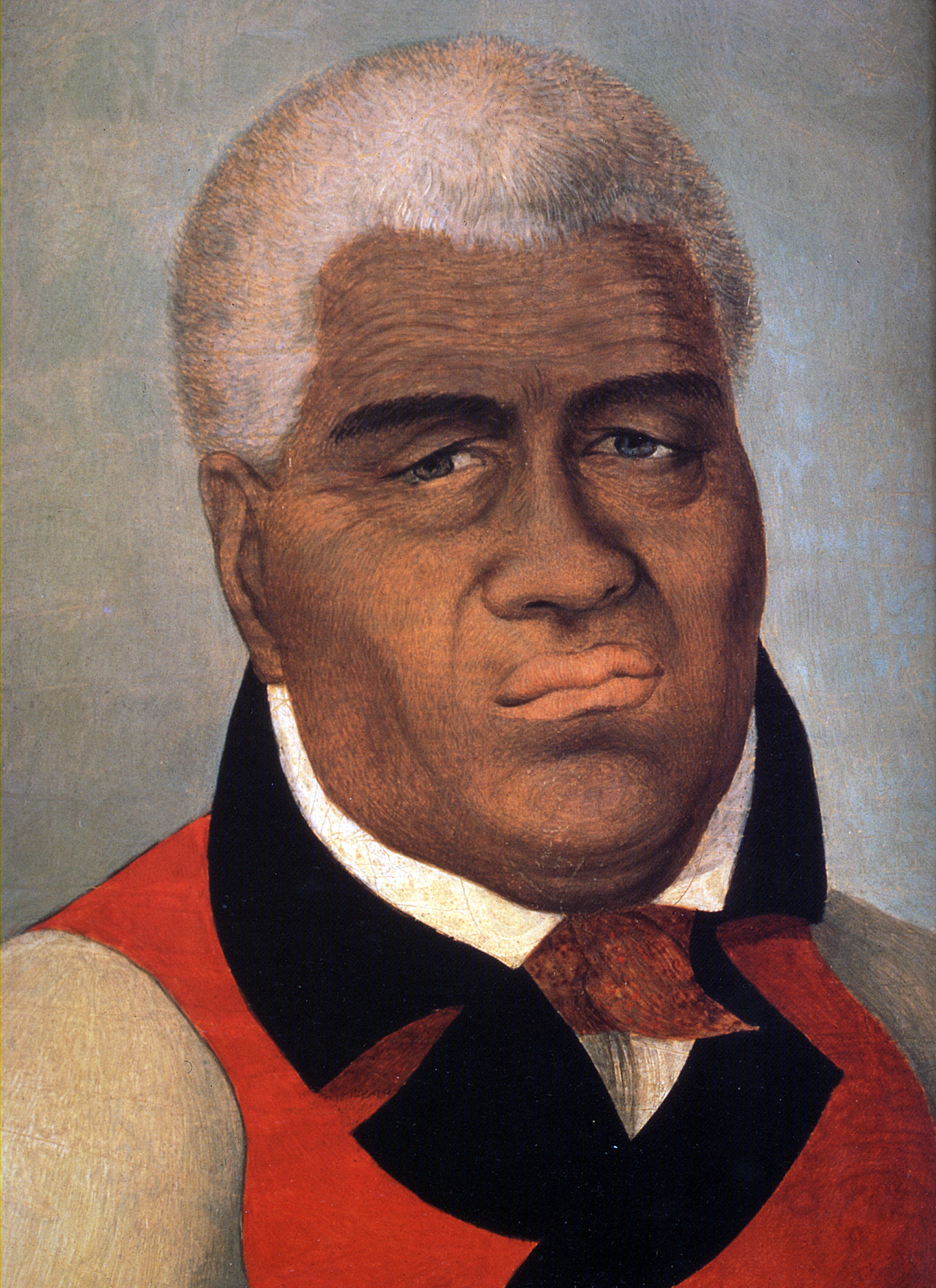
Kamehameha I

- January 9 – Princess Catherine Pavlovna of Russia, Queen of Württemberg (b. 1788)
- January 12 – Benedikte Naubert, German writer (b. 1752)
- January 19 – Elsa Beata Bunge, Swedish botanist (b. 1734)
- January 20 – King Charles IV of Spain (b. 1748)
- February 17 – Henry Constantine Jennings, British collector, gambler (b. 1731)
- February 25 – Francisco Manoel de Nascimento, Portuguese poet (b. 1734)
- March – Nonosabasut, Beothuk (indigenous Canadian) leader
- March 10 – Friedrich Heinrich Jacobi, German philosopher (b. 1743)
- April 15 – Oliver Evans, American inventor, engineer and businessman (b. 1755)
- May 8 – Kamehameha I, King of Hawaii (b. 1738)
- May 22 – Hugh Williamson, American Founding Father (b. 1735)
- June 6 – Johann von Hiller, Austrian general (b. 1754)
- June 8 – George Barclay, English politician (b.1759)
- June 28 – María Antonia Santos Plata, Neogranadine rebel leader, heroine (b. 1782)

=== July–December ===
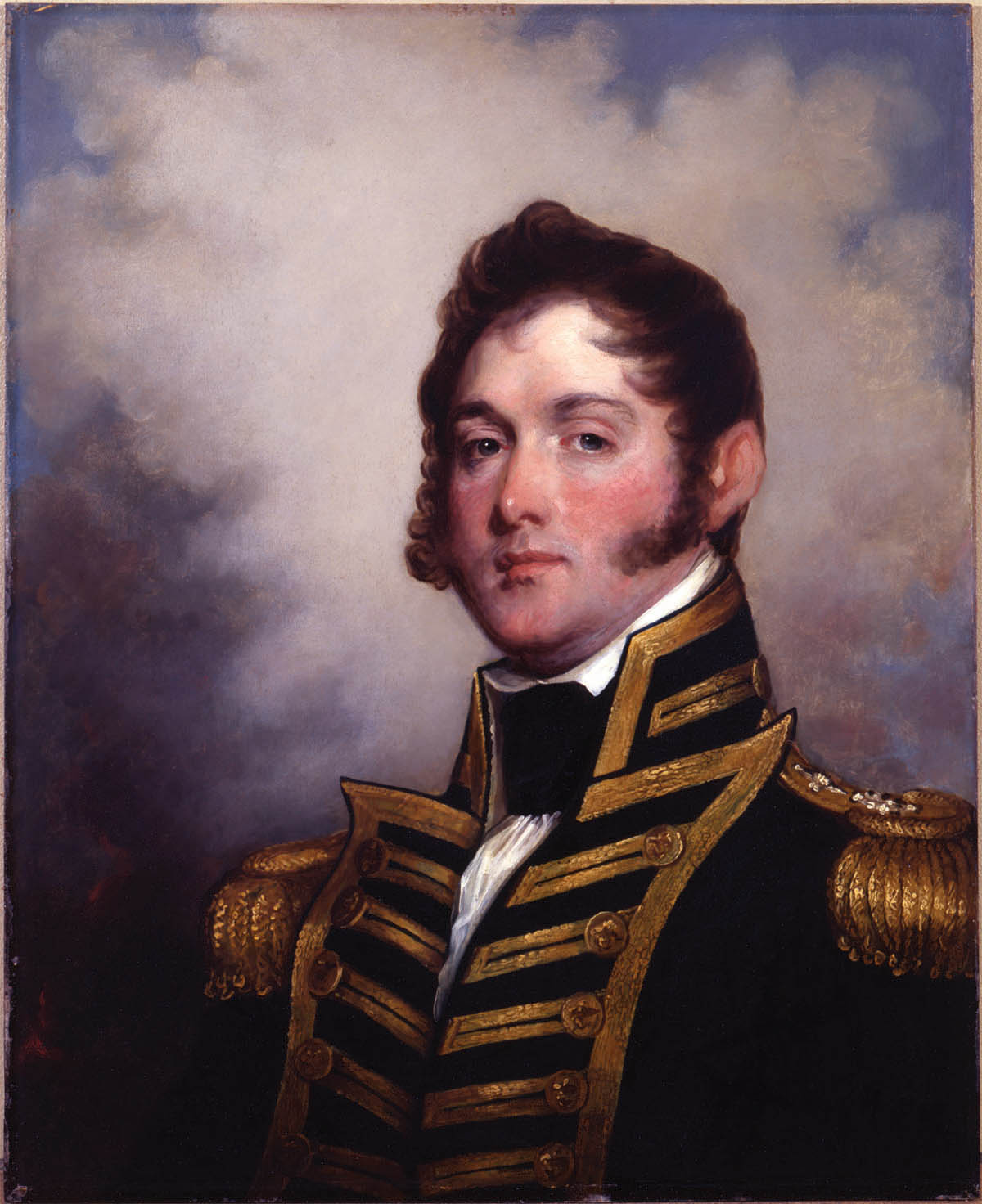
Oliver Hazard Perry

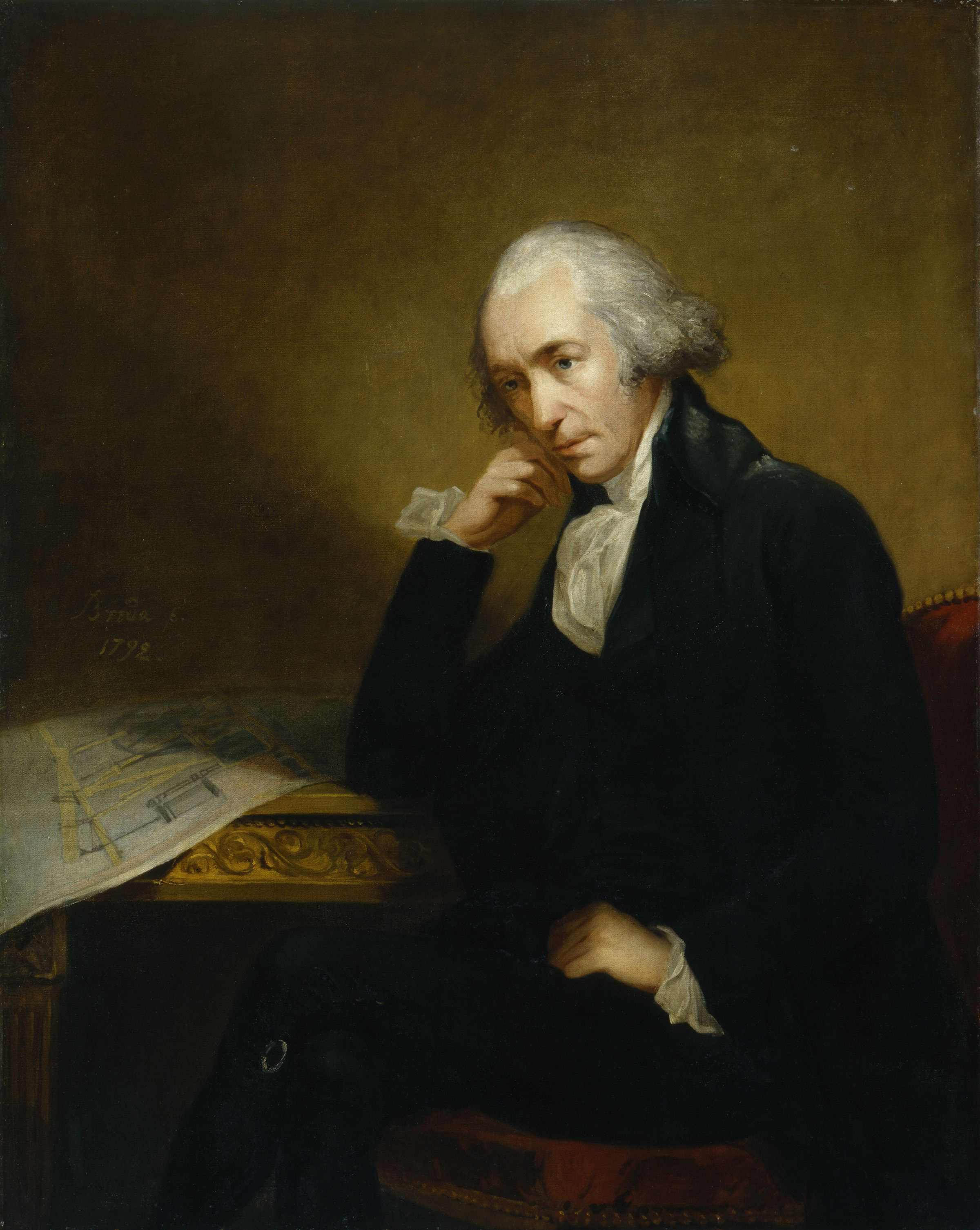
James Watt

- July 1 – the Public Universal Friend, American preacher (b. 1752)
- July 6 – Sophie Blanchard, French aeronaut (b. 1778)
- July 20 – John Playfair, Scottish scientist, mathematician (b. 1748)
- July 26 – George Leonard, American lawyer, jurist and politician (b. 1729)
- August 3 – Simon Knéfacz, Croatian writer (b. 1752)
- August 9 – John Faucheraud Grimké, American politician (b. 1752)
- August 16 – William Lewis, American politician (b. 1752)
- August 21 – Haim Farhi, Jewish adviser to the Ottoman Empire (assassinated) (b. 1760)
- August 23 – Oliver Hazard Perry, American naval officer (b. 1785)
- August 25 – James Watt, Scottish inventor (b. 1736)
- September 12 – Gebhard Leberecht von Blücher, Prussian general (b. 1742)
- September 18 – John Langdon, American Founding Father (b. 1741)
- September 20 – Abbé Faria, Luso-Goan hypnotist (b. 1746)
- October 1 – James Bunbury White, American politician (b. 1774)
- October 6 – Charles Emmanuel IV of Savoy, abdicated King of Sardinia (b. 1751)
- October 7 – William Samuel Johnson, American Founding Father (b. 1727)
- October 13 – Imperial Concubine Chun of the Jiaqing Emperor of China
- October 26 – Thomas Johnson, American politician and jurist (b. 1732)
- November 7 – Caleb Strong, American politician (b. 1745)
- November 9 – Simon Snyder, American politician (b. 1759)
- November 25 – Alexander Tormasov, Russian general (b. 1752)
- December 5 – Friedrich Leopold zu Stolberg-Stolberg, German poet (b. 1750)
- December 15 – Daniel Rutherford, Scottish physician, chemist and botanist (b. 1749)
- December 17 – Charles Finch (MP), British politician (b. 1752)
- December 19
  - Thomas Fremantle, English naval officer, politician (b. 1765)
  - Henry Latimer (senator), American politician (b. 1752)

=== Date unknown ===
- Mariano Osorio, Governor of Chile (b. 1777)
- Franciszek Ksawery Branicki, Polish nobleman (b. c. 1730)
