= '10s =

'10s may refer to:

- 1810s
- 1910s
- 2010s

== See also ==
- 10s, a decade in the 1st century AD
- 10s BC, a decade in the 1st century BC
