= 1819 in Iran =

- Decades
- See also: Other events of 1819; Years in Iran

The following lists events that happened during 1819 in Qajar era.

== Incumbents ==
- Monarch: Fath-Ali Shah Qajar

== Births ==
- ? – Báb, founder of Bábism and, according to the Baháʼís, predecessor of Baháʼu'lláh.
