= Ferenc Pulszky =

Hungarian politician and writer (1814–1897)

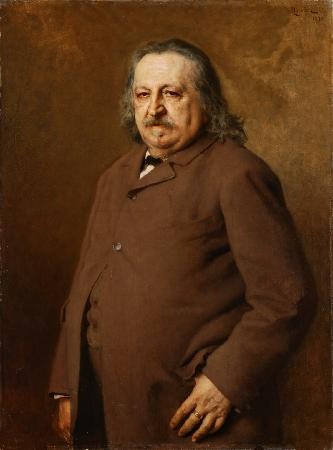
- Portrait of Pulszky in 1890
- Born: Ferenc Aurél Emánuel Pulszky de Cselfalva et Lubócz; 17 September 1814; Eperjes, Kingdom of Hungary, Austrian Empire
- Died: 9 September 1897 (aged 82); Budapest, Austria-Hungary
- Occupations: Politician; writer; nobleman
- Spouse: Theresa Pulszky

Ferenc Aurél Emánuel Pulszky de Cselfalva et Lubócz (Hungarian: cselfalvi és lubóczi Pulszky Ferenc Aurél Emánuel; 17 September 1814 – 9 September 1897) was a Hungarian politician, writer and nobleman. After fleeing Hungary in 1849 and being condemned to death in his absence, he was able to return and resume his political career in 1866 under an imperial amnesty.

== Biography ==
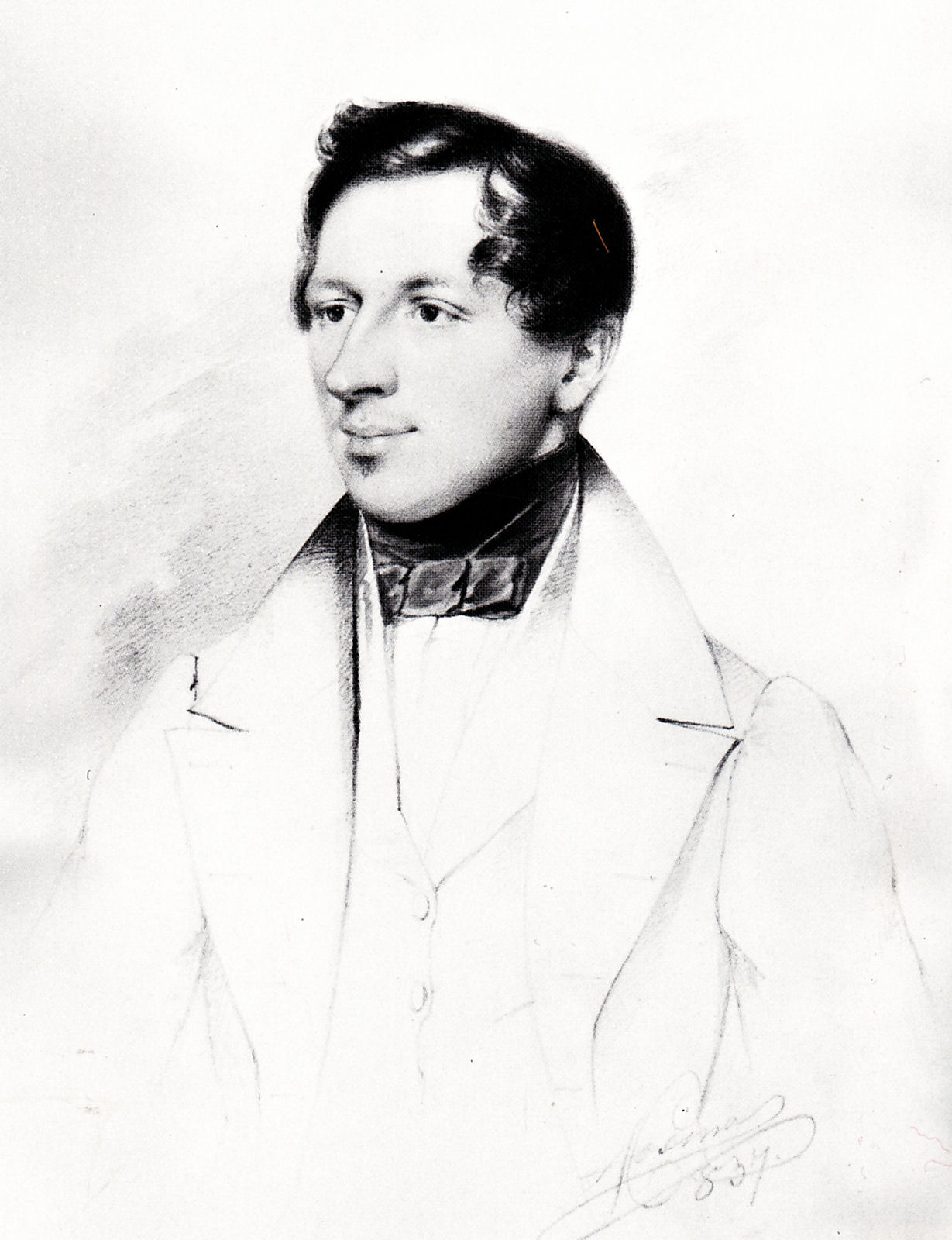
Ferenc Pulszky in 1837

He was born at Eperjes, now Prešov in Slovakia. After studying law and philosophy at high schools in Miskolc, he traveled abroad. England particularly attracted him, and his German-language book Aus dem Tagebuch eines in Grossbritannien reisenden Ungarns (From the Diary of a Hungarian Travelling in Britain) (Pesth, 1837) gained him membership of the Hungarian Academy.

Elected to the Diet of Hungary of 1840, he was in 1848 appointed to a financial post in the Hungarian government, and was transferred in a similar capacity to Vienna under Esterházy. He was suspected of intriguing with the revolutionists of that year and fled to Budapest, where he became an active member of the Committee of National Defence. When obliged to flee again after Hungary's defeat in the 1848–49 war of independence, he joined Lajos Kossuth in England and with him made a tour in the United States. In collaboration with his wife, he wrote a narrative of this voyage entitled White, Red, Black (2 vols., London, 1853). He also wrote a historical introduction to his wife's Memoirs of a Hungarian Lady (by Theresa Pulszky, London, 1850).

Pulszky was condemned to death in contumaciam (in contempt of court, Pulszky having not attended) by a council of war in his home country in 1852. In 1860 he went to Italy, took part in Giuseppe Garibaldi's ill-fated expedition to Rome (1862), and was interned as a prisoner of war in Naples. Pulszky's salon in a villa in S. Margherita a Montici, Florence, was the liveliest in town. He financed the newspaper "Il Progresso." His son, Giulio Francesco Pulszky, died on 19 November 1863, aged 14, and is buried at English Cemetery, Florence. His surviving children were Augustus, Charles, Polixena, and Garibaldi.

Amnestied by the emperor of Austria in 1866, Pulszky returned home and re-entered public life. He was in 1867–1876 and again in 1884 a member of the newly reformed Diet or National Assembly, where he joined the party named after Ferenc Deák. He was elected as a member to the American Philosophical Society in 1886.

In addition to his political activity, Pulszky was president of the literary section of the Hungarian Academy and director of the National Museum in Budapest, where he became distinguished for his archaeological researches. He employed his influence to promote both art and science and liberal views in his native country. He died in Budapest on 9 September 1897.

== Masonic career ==
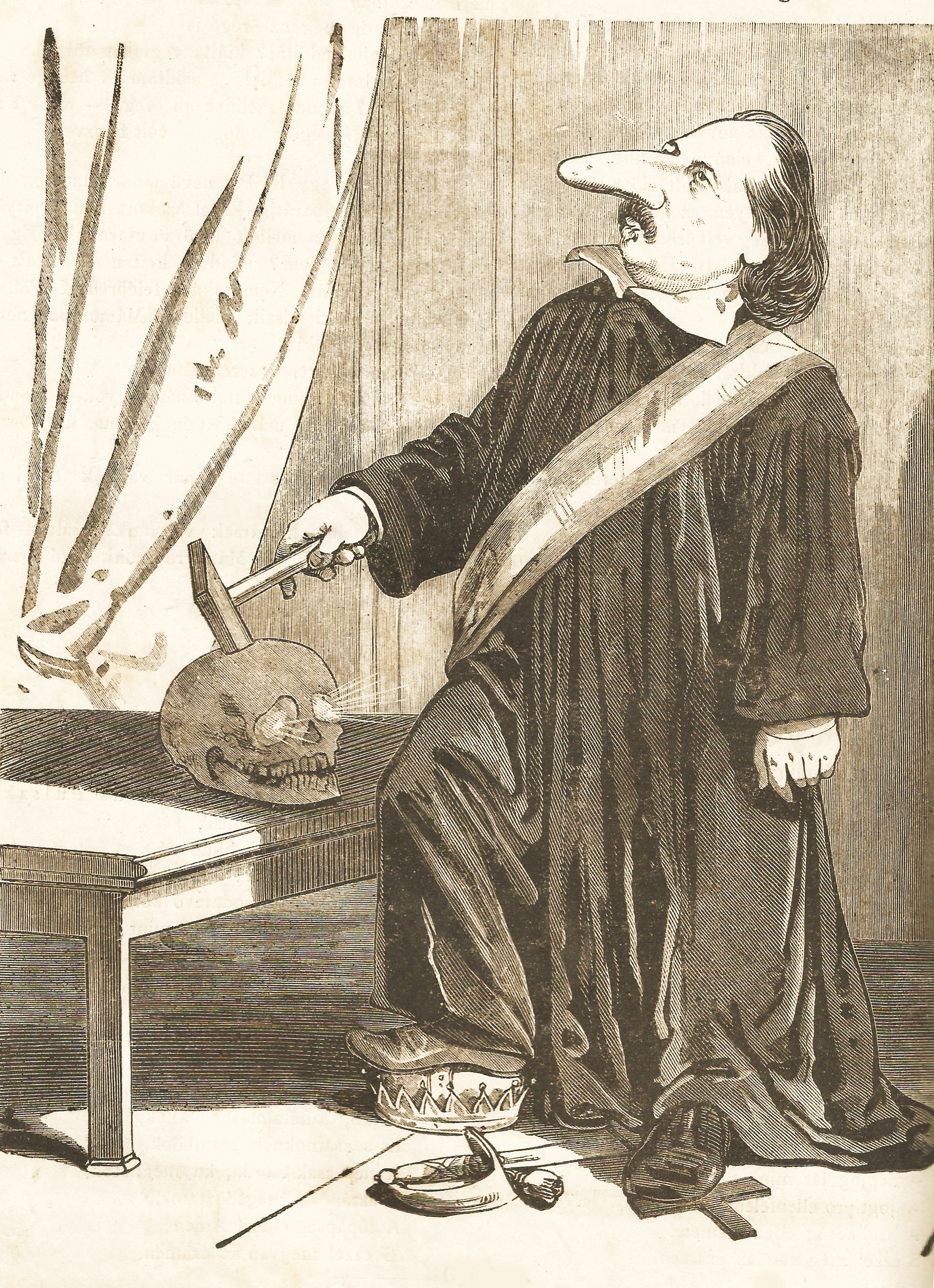
As Grand Master - János Jankó's caricature

Pulszky was initiated in 1863 into Lodge Dante Alighieri in Turin and was soon raised to the 33rd grade of the Scottish Rite. After his return to Hungary he contributed to reestablishing Hungarian freemasonry, first as Master of the Lodge "Einigkeit in Vaterland/Egység a hazában" (Unity in the Homeland), then as first Grand Master of the Grand Lodge of St. John. After the establishment of the Symbolic Grand Lodge of Hungary (combining the Grand Lodge of St John and the Grand Orient at 1886) he became its first Grand Master. In 1875, he supported Countess Helene Hadik Barkóczy's initiation into a Masonic lodge.

== Works ==
- Die Jacobiner in Ungarn (The Jacobins in Hungary) (Leipzig, 1851)
- Életem és korom (My Life and Times) (Pest, 1880)
- Aus dem Tagebuch eines in Grossbritannien reisenden Ungarns (From the Diary of a Hungarian Travelling in Britain) (Pesth, 1837)
- White, Red, Black, with his wife Theresa Pulszky (2 vols., London, 1853)
- Many treatises on Hungarian questions in the publications of the Hungarian Academy.

== See also ==
- Laszló Lovassy
- József Madarász
