= Theresa Pulszky =

Austro-Hungarian historical and travel author

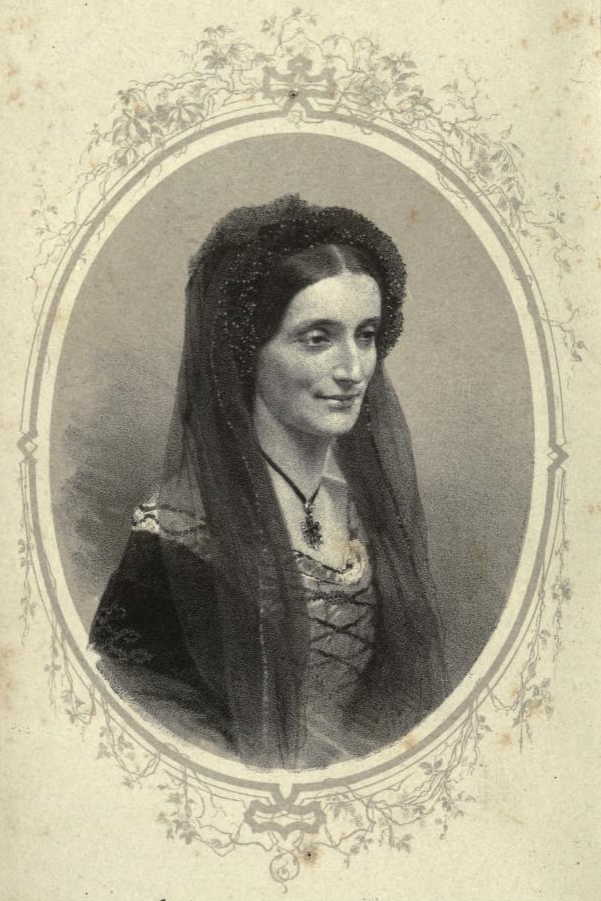
- Lithograph of Theresa Pulszky (1852)
- Born: Theresa Walter; 7 January 1819; Vienna, Austrian Empire
- Died: September 4, 1866 (aged 47); Pest, Kingdom of Hungary
- Occupations: Author and translator
- Years active: 1850–1859
- Notable work: Memoirs of a Hungarian Lady (1850); Tales and Traditions of Hungary (1852); White, Red, Black (1853)

Theresa Pulszky (7 January 1819 – 4 September 1866), also known as Terézia Pulszky, was an Austro-Hungarian author and translator. Born in a Viennese family, she moved to Pest, Hungary after marrying her husband Ferenc Pulszky. Her experiences in Hungary and her subsequent escape from the country during the Hungarian Revolution of 1848 to London, England was written down in diary form and published in 1850 as the highly acclaimed book Memoirs of a Hungarian Lady. She and her husband published several more works together from their later experiences and translated Hungarian stories, poems, and culture for English audiences. Together with her family, she traveled across the United States alongside abdicated Hungarian leader Lajos Kossuth in 1853, resulting in another positively reviewed book on their experiences in America.

The catalog in WorldCat lists 22 editions of her memoir and 24 editions of the travelogue she wrote with her husband. The digital collection in the New York Public Library holds one of her letters from 1854.

== Biography ==
=== Landlady of Castle Szecseny ===
Born on 7 January 1819 as Theresa Walter to a wealthy Viennese banker, Pulszky was first introduced to author and Hungarian political leader Ferenc Pulszky in 1845 after the suggestion for a meetup from a friend. She was highly interested in meeting someone from Hungary, which she viewed at the time as being a "land of uncultivated and unpeopled plains". Ferenc was contrary to those expectations and they were married several months later. They lived in London before her husband was allowed to return to Hungary and they moved to a manor named Castle Szecseny nearby Pest, Hungary. She spent her time observing the peasant population at the manor that served as tenants for the Pulszky family. Commentary in her 1850 book had her consider the official dinners among wealthy landlords to be "the most tedious of ceremonies", where 30 dishes were served individually rather than in courses and extensively lengthened the proceedings. During Christmas of 1847, Pulszky loaned seeds for potatoes and maize to the 108 tenants with the requirement that the amount of seeds returned after the harvesting season should be greater than the amount given. The following winter in 1848 saw her return for a visit to her birthplace of Vienna.

=== 1848 revolution and escape ===
When news of the French Revolution of 1848 reached them, her husband joined her at Vienna from Pressburg and they left on 9 March to return to Pest. It was only after their arrival that they were notified of the revolution that had happened in Austria, including Vienna, just days after their departure. Not long after, the Hungarian Revolution of 1848 occurred and spread to Pest and Pulszky gave passports to her children and servants, sending them away from the manor to a neighboring country and she followed a few days later at the end of March. Staying in a mountainous region until February 1849, she was notified that conflict was again spreading to the area and caused her and the two children to have to find a new home to stay in. This occurred several more times as Pulszky was approaching the birth of her third child. She attempted to get a message to her parents to Vienna in order to have new passports made, but the maid carrying the letter was identified and imprisoned. By April 1849, the conflict had subsided and Pulszky and her family were able to return to their manor in Pest. She visited Buda in late May and took note of ongoing conflicts involving the Russian and Austrian armies that were forming in the north of Hungary. Determined to find a way to pass through to western Europe, she visited the city of Debrecen where the new government resided during the revolution. She spent several days trying and failing to convince Lajos Kossuth to provide her a passport before she turned back toward Pest.

On the journey back, she met an old woman trying to reach a particular location in Austria and they chose to travel together. She still was unable to obtain a passport and had to hide herself in order to avoid being recognized as the wife of the landlord of Castle Szecseny. She returned home to Pest disguised as a servant and avoided recognition despite being accosted and inspected by a branch of the Austrian army during her return. By the time she was able to get to Pest in July, the Russian military was advancing through the north of Hungary and the leaders of the country were unable to resist the assault. Pulszky decided she needed to make one more attempt to find a way out of the country for good and met with a German couple trying to return to their home country with a passport their government had provided to them. Agreeing to allow her to act as the German wife's companion, they were eventually able to travel through Austria and arrive in Prussia before traveling by railroad to Belgium where Pulszky split from the couple. Now in western Europe, she no longer required a passport to travel between countries and was able to travel to London where she reunited with her husband and their children were able to travel there not long after. All of their exploits and her history and travels were covered in her 1850 published work Memoirs of a Hungarian Lady.

=== Later life and authorship ===
After his abdication of the throne of Hungary and escape from imprisonment, Lajos Kossuth was approved for travel to the United States in October 1851 with a number of his functionaries. He was greeted on his temporary stop in Southampton, England on 23 October 1851 by Pulszky and her husband. They decided to travel onward with him to the United States and join him on his trip across the country, departing from Cowes on 20 November 1851 aboard the Humboldt. After their tour in the United States, both the Pulszky family and Kossuth returned to live in London, England. At that time in 1854, they had five children and were making around £400 annually. Despite her father's wealth, he was not allowed to send any money to support her and the manor estate in Pest had been seized by Austrian authorities over the previous years and converted into a hospital.

Pulszky's 1852 book The Tradition of the Hungarian Race (U.S. edition) included a portrait of her, an essay, and 20 Hungarian myths and legends including "The Baron's Daughter" and "The Hungarian Outlaws". She and her husband recounted their travels in the U.S. with Kossuth in the 1853 book White, Red, Black: Sketches of Society in the United States During the Visit of Their Guest.

Pulszky was a musician and participated in private concerts at house parties. The Daily News noted a performance on 19 July 1853 reporting she had the "skill of a thorough musician" and the "smooth, legato touch" required to play the seraphine. She died on 4 September 1866 from cholera, a day after one of her daughters died from typhus.

== Bibliography ==
- Memoirs of a Hungarian Lady, with a historical introduction by Ferenc Pulszky, London, Henry Colburn (1850)
- The Tradition of the Hungarian Race / Tales and Traditions of Hungary (U.S. edition), New York: Redfield (1852)
- White, Red, Black: Sketches of Society in the United States During the Visit of Their Guest, with her husband, 3 vols., Trubner and Co., London (1853)
- The Hero of Our Days by Michael Lermontoff (Russian). Translated by Theresa Pulszky, Thomas Hodgson (1854)
- Three Christmas Plays for Children: The Sleeper Awakened; the Wonderful Bird; Crinolina, with music by Professor L. Jansa and illustrations by Charles Armytage, Griffith and Farran (1859)
