= Johann Georg Tralles =

German mathematician and physicist (1763–1822)

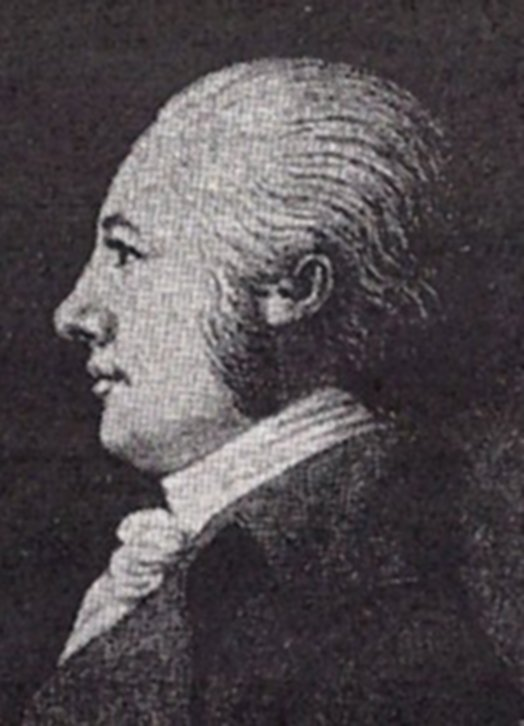

Johann Georg Tralles (15 October 1763 – 19 November 1822) was a German mathematician and physicist.

He was born in Hamburg, Germany and was educated at the University of Göttingen beginning in 1783. He became a professor at the University of Bern in 1785. In 1810, he became a professor of mathematics at the University of Berlin.

In 1798 he served as the Swiss representative to the French metric convocation, and was a member of its committee on weights and measures. The iron Committee Meter, a duplicate of the prototype archive meter, was then given as a gift to Ferdinand Rudolph Hassler. From 1803 until 1805 these two men worked together on a topological survey of the Canton of Bern.

In 1819, he discovered the Great Comet of 1819, Comet Tralles, named after him.

He was the inventor of the alcoholometer, a device for measuring the amount of alcohol in a liquid.

He died in London, England. The crater Tralles on the Moon is named after him, as is the alcoholometer he invented.

== Bibliography ==
- "Der erste Ordinarius für Mathematik an der Universität Berlin", Eine Edition seiner Antrittsvorlesung, 1810.
- "Beytrag zur Lehre von der Elektrizität" Bern, Haller, 1786
