= Great Comet of 1819 =

Non-periodic comet

C/1819 N1 (Tralles) (Great Comet of 1819)
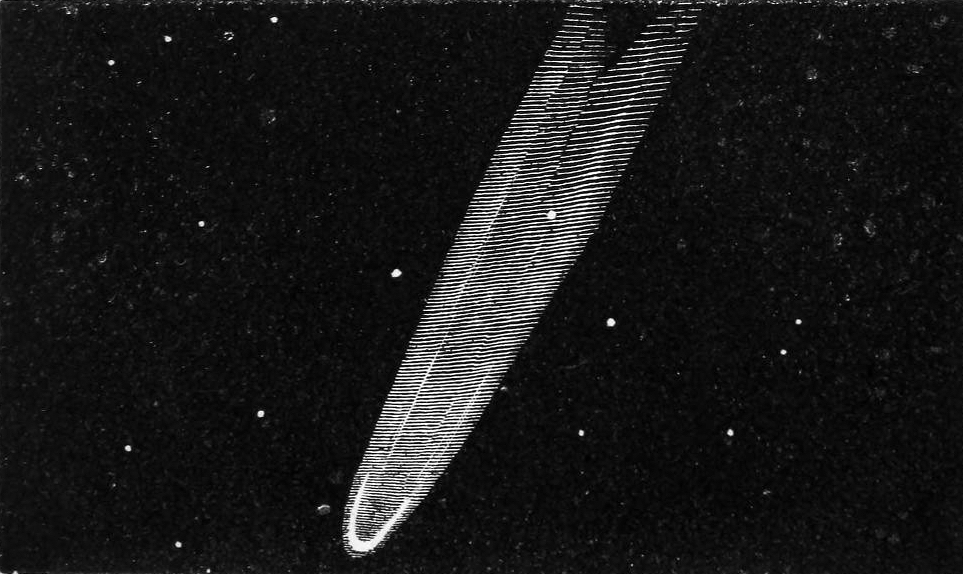
- A sketch of the Great Comet of 1819 from Ezra Otis Kendall's 1850 book, Uranography.

Discovery
- Discovered by: Johann Georg Tralles
- Discovery site: Berlin, Germany
- Discovery date: 1 July 1819

Designations
- Alternative designations: 1819 II

Orbital characteristics
- Epoch: 25 July 1831 (JD 2385640.5)
- Observation arc: 105 days
- Earliest precovery date: 26 June 1819
- Number of observations: 692
- Perihelion: 0.342 AU
- Semi-major axis: ~278 AU
- Eccentricity: 0.99887
- Orbital period: ~4,630 years
- Inclination: 83.966°
- Longitude of ascending node: 279.37°
- Argument of periapsis: 87.389°
- Last perihelion: 28 June 1819

Physical characteristics
- Apparent magnitude: 0.0 (1819 apparition)

The Great Comet of 1819, officially designated as C/1819 N1, also known as Comet Tralles, was an exceptionally bright and easily visible non-periodic comet, approaching an apparent magnitude of 1–2, discovered 1 July 1819 by the German astronomer Johann Georg Tralles in Berlin. It was the first comet analyzed using polarimetry, by French mathematician François Arago.

== Observational history ==
=== Discovery ===
On 1 July 1819, Johann Georg Tralles in Berlin observed a brilliant comet low in the sky during the evening twilight. It was confirmed the next night by the astronomer Johann Elert Bode, also in Berlin.

=== Follow-up observations ===
On July 2, Tralles found the comet to have a coma of 40″. On July 3, Friedrich Georg Wilhelm von Struve measured the nucleus at 8″ with a tail of several degrees. Heinrich Wilhelm Matthias Olbers reported that the nucleus had an apparent magnitude of 1–2 and a tail about 7–8° long. The comet was last sighted by Struve on October 25.

Also on 3 July, François Arago used a polarimeter of his own invention to analyze the light from the comet's tail and discovered that it was polarized. He then observed the nearest star, Capella, which did not show polarized light. This indicated that some light from the comet's tail was reflected from the sun. This marked the first polarimetric observation of a comet.

=== Transit of the Sun ===
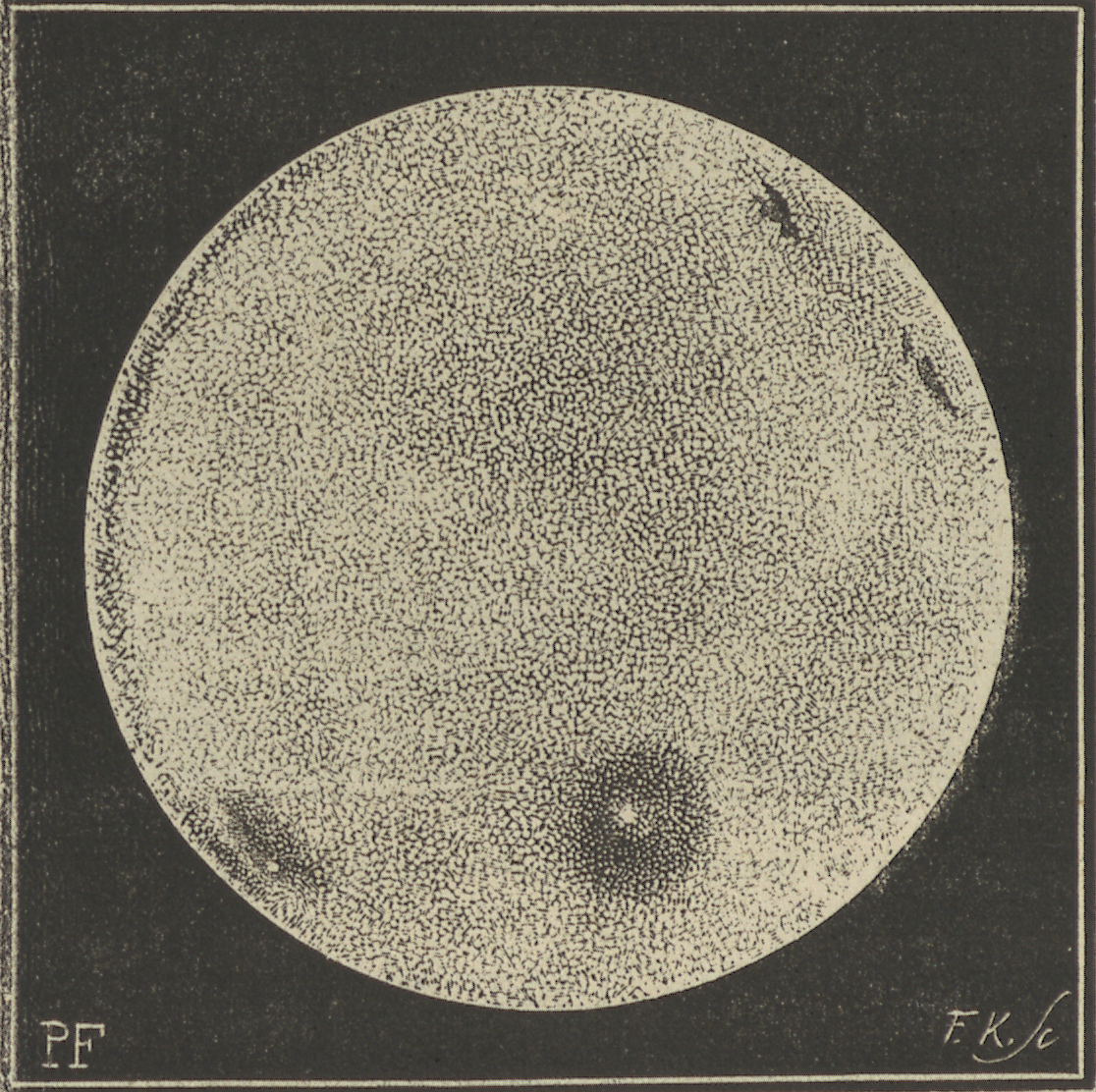
Sketch of the Sun on 26 June by Johann Wilhelm Pastorff, claiming it depicts the transit of the comet.

After the orbital elements of the comet were calculated by Olbers, he discovered that a transit of the Sun by the comet had occurred on June 26, days before its first observations. He reported this to Bode on 27 July. After this announcement many Sun observers searched their notes to see if they had noted something unusual that day. Johann Wilhelm Pastorff noted that he saw on that day a round nebulousity with a bright spot near its center and made a sketch of it. Canon Stark from Augsburg also noted in Meteorologisches Jahrbuch that he saw an ill-defined small spot in the Sun at 7:15 A.M. on June 26, 15' 25" from the west limb of the Sun, that wasn't present at noon. John Russell Hind noted that the positions given by Johann Wilhelm Pastorff were considerably different than the expected location of the comet, and also considered it improbable that the comet would resemble Pastorff's sketch. On the other hand, he concluded that Canon Stark perhaps did observe the comet, although the mentioned position was a bit off. In a 2017 paper, astronomer Richard L. Branham Jr. agreed that Canon Stark likely did see the transit.

== Orbit ==
Orbital elements for the comet were calculated by several astronomers. The orbit is classified as parabolic and is nearly perpendicular to Earth's orbital plane, with an inclination of 80°. It passed closest to the Earth on June 25 at a distance of 0.67 AU (100 million km) and closest to the Sun on June 28 at 0.34 AU (51 million km).

The orbit of the comet and its transit of the Sun were later analyzed by astronomer John Russell Hind.

In 2016, the orbit was recalculated based on a total of 692 observations of the comet taken in 1819, with the resulting conclusion that the comet will not return for over 3,000 years and represents no threat to the Earth, and that Near Eastern records around 2550 BCE may be found to mention its earlier passage.

== In literature ==
The comet was widely seen and noted by people who were not astronomers. Poet John Keats noted how he and his wife Fanny had stared at the comet. Historian Nathaniel Philbrick writes about the great comet seen in July 1819 by the people on the island of Nantucket, Massachusetts in his 2000 book, In the Heart of the Sea. The comet was observed by the Stephen Long expedition to the Great Plains from near present day Jefferson City, Missouri.
