= Denis Johnson (inventor) =

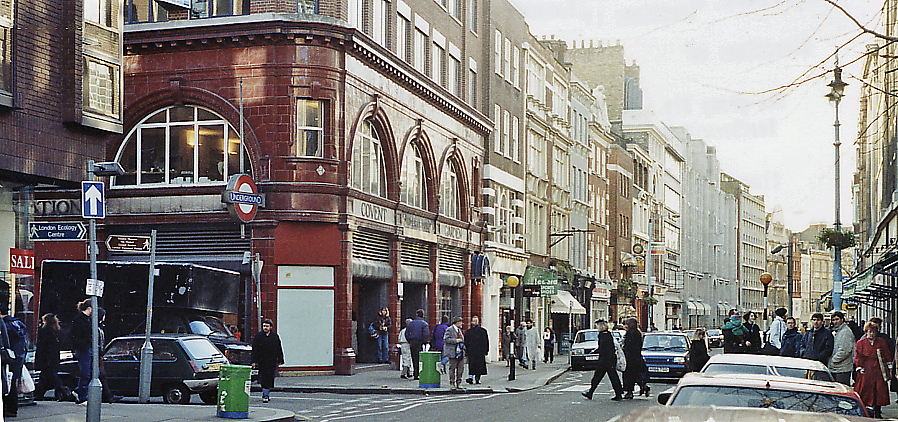
Long Acre in London, formerly known for coachmakers, including Denis Johnson.

Denis Johnson (c. 1760 – 25 December 1833) was an English coachmaker who worked on Long Acre, London, England. He was a pioneer bicycle-maker.

== Biography ==
Johnson was married to Mary Newman in St Anne's Church, Soho in 1792 and they had two daughters. He worked out of 75 Long Acre for about 15 years from 1818. Johnson continued as a coachmaker until he died on Christmas Day 1833. The family business continued to trade here until 1867.

== Bicycle maker ==
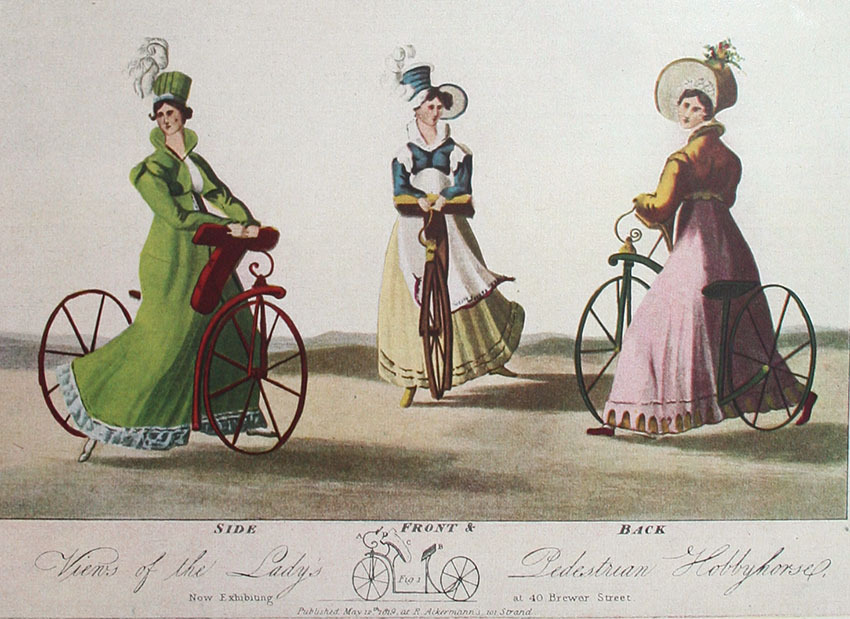
Johnson’s Ladies’ Walking Machine, 1818-1819

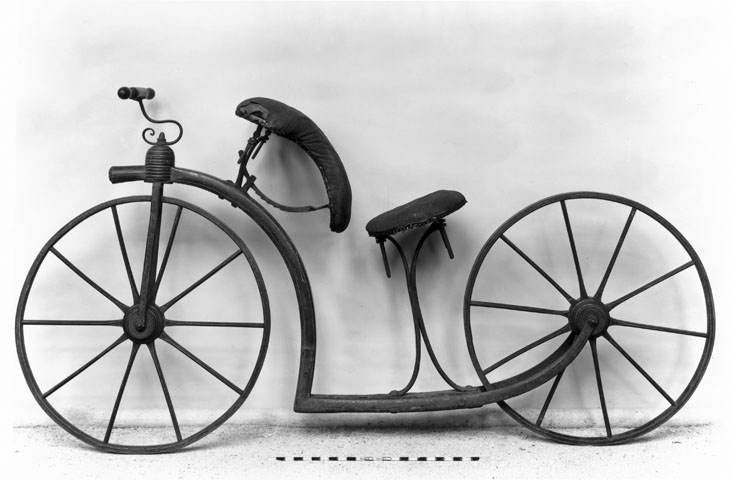
The remaining extant model, in the Science Museum, London

Johnson created an improved version of the German Karl Drais's Draisine, the archetypal bicycle. Johnson's pedestrian curricle was patented in London in December 1818, becoming Britain's first bicycle. It featured an elegantly curved wooden frame, allowing the use of larger wooden wheels. Several parts were made of metal, which allowed the vehicle to be lighter than the continental version.

Although Johnson referred to his machine as a ‘pedestrian curricle’, it was formally referred to as a ‘velocipede’, and popularly as a ‘Hobby-horse’, ‘Dandy-horse’, ‘Pedestrian's accelerator’, ‘Swift walker’ and by a variety of other names.

Johnson made at least 320 velocipedes in the early part of 1819. He also opened riding schools in the Strand and Soho. In May 1819 he introduced a dropped-frame version for ladies to accommodate their long skirts (see image).

For about six months the machine had a high profile in London and elsewhere, its principal riders being the Regency dandies. About eighty prints were produced in London, depicting the 'hobby-horse' and its users, not always in a flattering light. Johnson undertook a tour of England in the spring of 1819 to exhibit and publicise the item. Nevertheless, by the summer of the same year the craze was dying out, and a health warning against the continued use of the velocipede was issued by the London Surgeons.

In Johnson's machine, like that of von Drais, propulsion was simply by ‘swift walking’, with the rider striking his (or her) feet on the ground alternately. Later, in the 1860s, rotary cranks and pedals were added to the bicycle.

== Legacy ==
A memorial plaque at 69–75 Long Acre, Covent Garden, the former site of his workshop, was unveiled on 2 July 1998 by Tony Banks MP, Minister for Sport.
