= Sidewheel =

Sidewheel, or Sidewheeler or Sidewheels may refer to:

- Sidewheel steamer, type of paddle steamer
- Paddle wheel, type of water wheel
- Training wheels
