= Lucius B. Packard =

American automotive pioneer

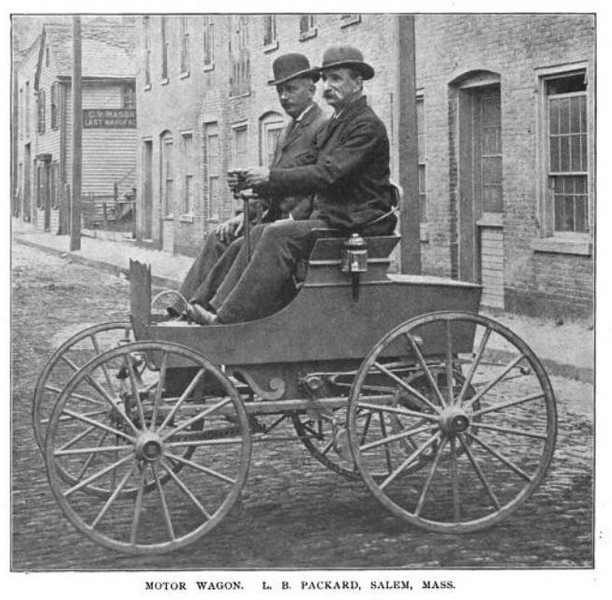
Lucius B. Packard in his 2hp Motor Wagon - Horseless Age magazine, June 1896

Lucius B. Packard (c. 1836-1914) was an American wheelwright, cabinetmaker and automobile pioneer in the Veteran Car Era. He built his first Velocipede in Peabody, Massachusetts in 1860, followed by a "real" bicycle in 1879 that was built in Salem, Massachusetts.

In 1895, L.B. Packard built a prototype automobile that featured a 2-bhp (ca. 1,5 kW) gasoline engine by the American Gas Engine Company that gave its power via a chain to the left rear wheel. Speed was controlled by two levers; one sat on the right of the steering lever. Moving it forward accelerated the vehicle, backwards slowed it. In a vertical position it brought the engine to idle. A second lever behind the seat did the same for reverse. Packard found a buyer for his car before he finished it.

In 1896 he completed another four-wheeled vehicle, this time with an electric engine. It was also derived from a horse-drawn carriage. His last car was built in 1898, an electric three-wheeler with a single front wheel, allowing the use of a long steering lever. It had a center-tube frame, and the bodywork was hinged with springs.

L. B. Packard worked in his shop and sold bicycles at Liberty and Derby streets in Salem until it was destroyed by a fire on June, 25th 1914. Packard died on October 14, 1914. Photographs exist of his runabout and the Three-Wheeler.

There is no known relationship with the Packard family from Warren, Ohio, founders of the later Packard Motor Car Company.
