= Healthcare Distribution Association =

The Healthcare Distribution Association is a trade association for wholesalers in the British pharmaceutical industry.

It has offices in Long Acre and operates across the United Kingdom. The director general is Warwick Smith and Martin Sawer is the executive director.

In August 2019 it warned that a no-deal Brexit would be a threat to pharmaceutical supplies and that the proposed mitigation measures - stockpiling and flying stock into the UK was not suitable for most medicines, especially temperature-controlled and short shelf-life products.
