= Training wheels =

Extra set of bicycle wheels that beginners use for stability

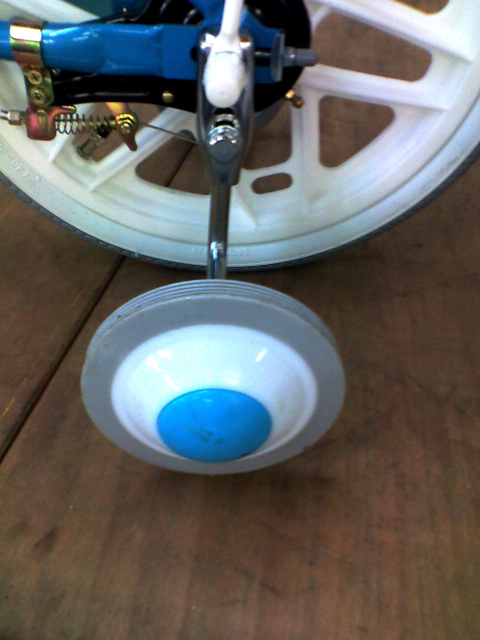
A training wheel

Training wheels, known as stabilizers outside North America, are a pair of additional wheels attached to the rear axle of a bicycle, effectively turning it into a quadricycle, for beginners learning to ride independently. Since the late 1990s, balance bikes have gradually replaced training wheels as a more effective tool for developing a sense of balance.

== History ==
The American company Huffy introduced training wheels in 1949 with its 'Convertible' bike. The typical design for training wheels has not changed since this time. They are composed of two small wheels, one on each side of the rear wheel of the bicycle. They are attached laterally to a metal bracket or frame that extends outward from the bicycle frame, ideally keeping the training wheels just above the ground. The bracket is meant to be adjustable to accommodate different heights and angles of the training wheels, allowing for customization based on the rider's needs, but this is difficult to achieve in practice.

The concept of training wheels can refer figuratively in English to any artificial support for a machine, especially in software development.

== Use ==
Training wheels in use, 2020

The functionality of training wheels is based on the premise that a learner rider can gradually develop their balance and coordination skills by relying on the support of the extra wheels. As the rider gains confidence and proficiency, the training wheels are gradually raised or removed, theoretically allowing the rider to transition to riding without additional support.

== Limitations ==
Researchers have demonstrated that training wheels delay the development of proper balance and steering skills. Reliance on training wheels prevents riders from fully experiencing the dynamic nature of riding a bicycle and leads to difficulties in transitioning to riding without them. Training wheels that prevent the bike from leaning also prevent countersteering, so that, as with a tricycle, children learn to turn the handlebars the wrong way, which must be unlearned later.

1. Limited balance development: Training wheels, while offering initial stability, inhibit the development of essential balance and coordination skills. The extra wheels prevent the rider from fully experiencing the natural side-to-side motion required for balance. As a result, riders may become overly reliant on the training wheels and struggle to transition to riding without them.
2. Delayed confidence building: Training wheels can create a false sense of security for young riders. As they become accustomed to the stability provided by the training wheels, they may not feel confident enough to ride without them. This can lead to a longer learning period and hinder the development of self-assurance.
3. Ineffective steering control: Training wheels limit the rider's ability to steer the bicycle effectively. Since the training wheels primarily support the weight, the rider has less control over the direction of the bicycle. This restriction can impede the development of essential manoeuvring skills and make it harder for the rider to navigate corners and obstacles.
4. Difficulty transitioning: Removing training wheels can be a challenging and intimidating process for young riders. The sudden shift from a supported riding experience to unsupported riding can be overwhelming and frustrating. Many children experience setbacks and become discouraged during this transition phase, often requiring additional time and support to become comfortable riding without training wheels.

Training wheels particularly become an obstacle to learning if they are adjusted incorrectly, because they prevent the bike from leaning if they are too low, and inhibit braking if too much weight is taken off the rear wheel by training wheels that are too low. Adjusting training wheels correctly, and raising them higher as the child's skill increases, helps to mitigate but does not completely eliminate these problems.

== Replacement by balance bikes ==
Returning to the bicycle's origin in the dandy horse, balance bikes rapidly gained favour in cycling pedagogy after their introduction in 1997. Balance bikes are bicycles without pedals that allow children to develop balance and coordination naturally without the use of training wheels. Learning to ride with a balance bike delivers greater long-term benefits for young riders than training wheels. Balance bikes began to supplant training wheels globally during the 2010s.
