= Long Acre =

London street

Coordinates: 51.5130°N 0.1246°W

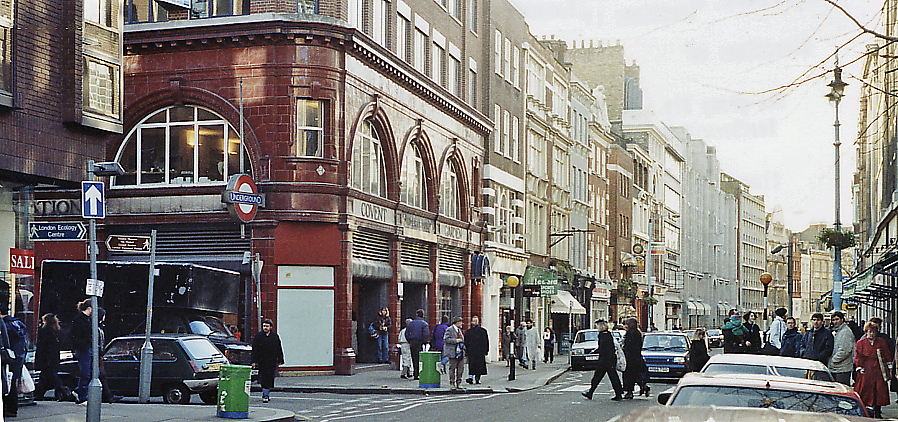
Long Acre pictured in 1991

Long Acre is a street in the City of Westminster in central London. It runs from St Martin's Lane, at its western end, to Drury Lane in the east. The street was completed in the early 17th century and was once known for its coach-makers, and later for its car dealers.

== History ==
After the dissolution of the monasteries in 1540, Henry VIII confiscated the land belonging to Westminster Abbey, including the convent garden of Covent Garden and land to the north originally called the Elms and later Seven Acres. In 1552, his son, Edward VI, granted it to John Russell, 1st Earl of Bedford. The Russell family, who in 1694 were advanced in their peerage from Earl to Duke of Bedford, held the land from 1552 to 1918.

At the time of Charles I it was renamed Long Acre after the length of the first pathway constructed across the land. Charles took offence at the condition of the road and houses along it, which were the responsibility of Russell and Henry Carey, 2nd Earl of Monmouth. Russell and Carey complained that under the 1625 Proclamation concerning Buildings, which restricted building in and around London, they could not build new houses; the King then granted Russell, for a fee of £2,000, a licence to build as many new houses on his land as he "shall thinke fitt and convenient". This licence allowed the development of Covent Garden Square to the south of Long Acre.

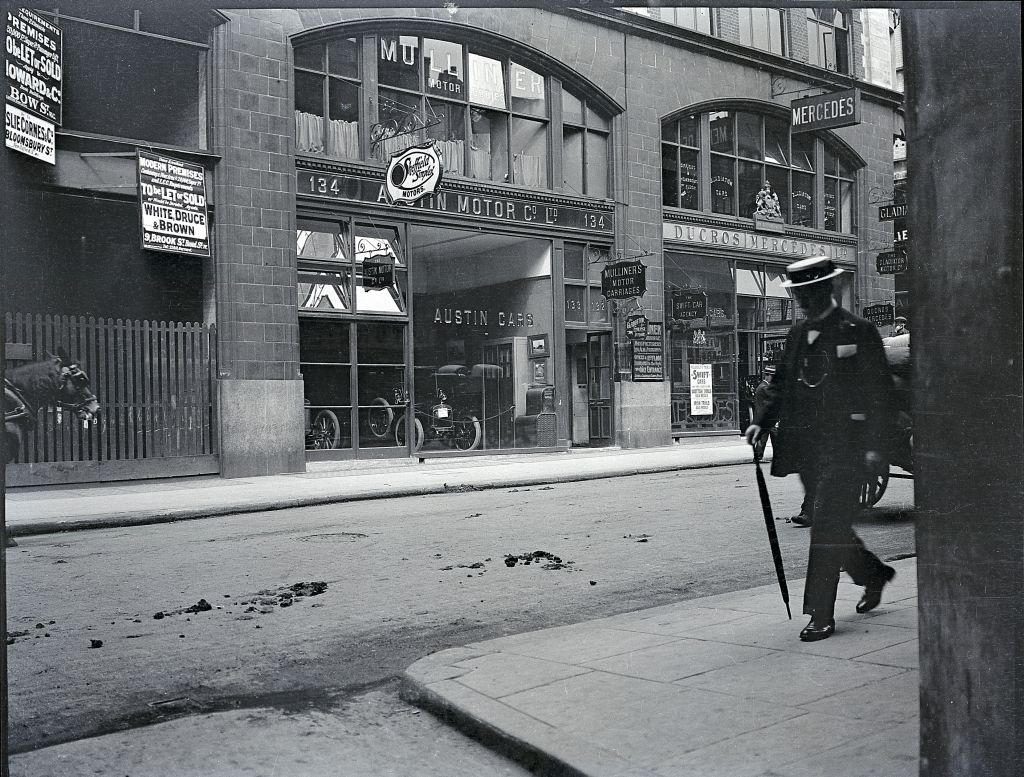
Austin Motors showroom, at 134 Long Acre, c. 1910

The coach-building trade dominated Long Acre in the 19th century – in 1906, there were 41 buildings in the street occupied by firms associated with transport, a mixture of traditional coach-builders and those connected with the motor trade. By 1916 the transition to motor cars and related trades was almost complete. The Austin Motors showroom was at 134, and Mercedes-Benz's at No. 127–130, close to Daimler and Fiat.

The section on the north side from Neal Street to Arne Street was occupied by Odhams Press from about 1890 to 1970. It published John Bull, which was the most popular magazine in Britain from 1916 to 1934. Odhams also published The Daily Herald, Woman's Own, Debrett's and Sporting Life (founded 1859). Odhams was bought by the International Publishing Corporation in 1961 and the site was closed down in 1969. Prior to Odhams, the site was occupied by the Queen's Theatre (1867–1878), the second-largest theatre in London at the time, after Drury Lane. It was here that Ellen Terry first met Henry Irving in a Shakespearean role. There is a plaque to commemorate the theatre, but it has been placed on the wrong block — the theatre was to the east of Endell Street, not the west. On Acre House (No. 69–75) is a green plaque commemorating Denis Johnson's workshop. He lived c. 1760 to 1833 and had a workshop here in 1819, selling "hobby horse" bicycles, the first to be sold in the United Kingdom. Emma Martin, author, socialist and free thinker worked as a midwife from No. 100, where her daughters ran a surgical bandage shop. No. 16 was, from the 1950s to early 20th century, the very successful wrought iron and metal workshop of Thomas John Gawthorp later joined by his two sons Thomas George et Walter Edmund; his work was sold far and wide, such as the wrought iron grid in the Stanley Chapel of St Cybi's Church (Holyhead on Holy Island, Wales). Their work was very much in the style of the Arts and Crafts movement; they were art metalworkers to Edward VIII and George V.

At No. 132, John Logie Baird made the first British television broadcast in 1929. Just off Long Acre is Langley Street, home of the Pineapple Dance Studios and London Film School, the oldest such school in the world. Just opposite, until 2000, was Paxman, one of the leading English manufacturers of French horns. It is said that the poet Richard Lovelace spent his final years in Long Acre, in great poverty. As a young man, Thomas Paine worked as a corset maker in Long Acre. In 1896, the Freemason's Arms was built; it still stands on Long Acre. Masonic symbols adorn the façade.

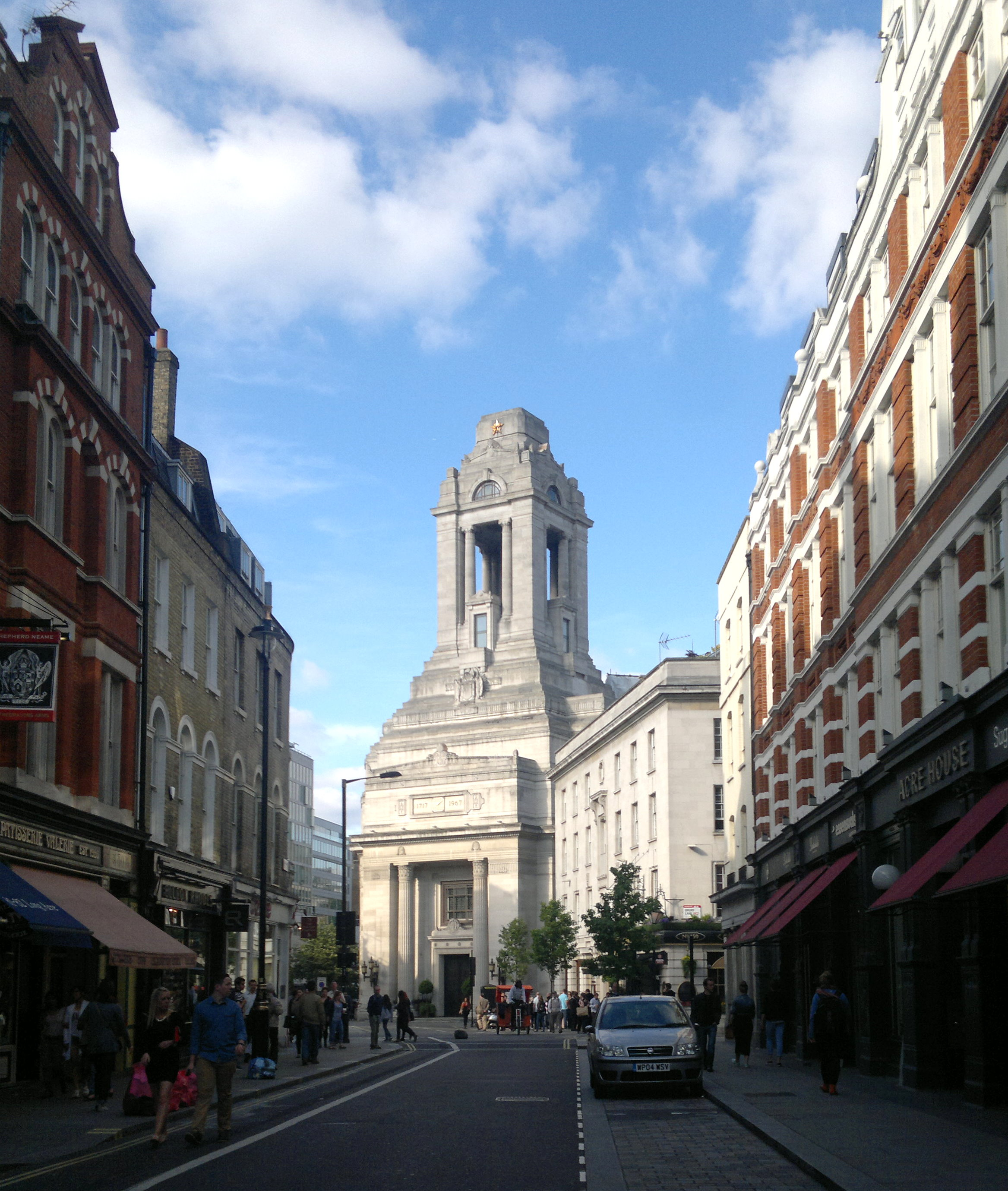
Freemasons' Hall at the eastern end of Long Acre

== Geography ==
Long Acre is numbered 1 to 77 on the south side and 78 to 144 on the north side. At the junction with James Street is Covent Garden Underground station.

Long Acre ends in the east at a junction with Drury Lane. Overlooking this junction is Freemasons' Hall, the headquarters of the British Freemasons, on Great Queen Street.

Long Acre is numbered B402 in the British road numbering scheme.
