= Jyrobike =

Bicycle with a special front wheel

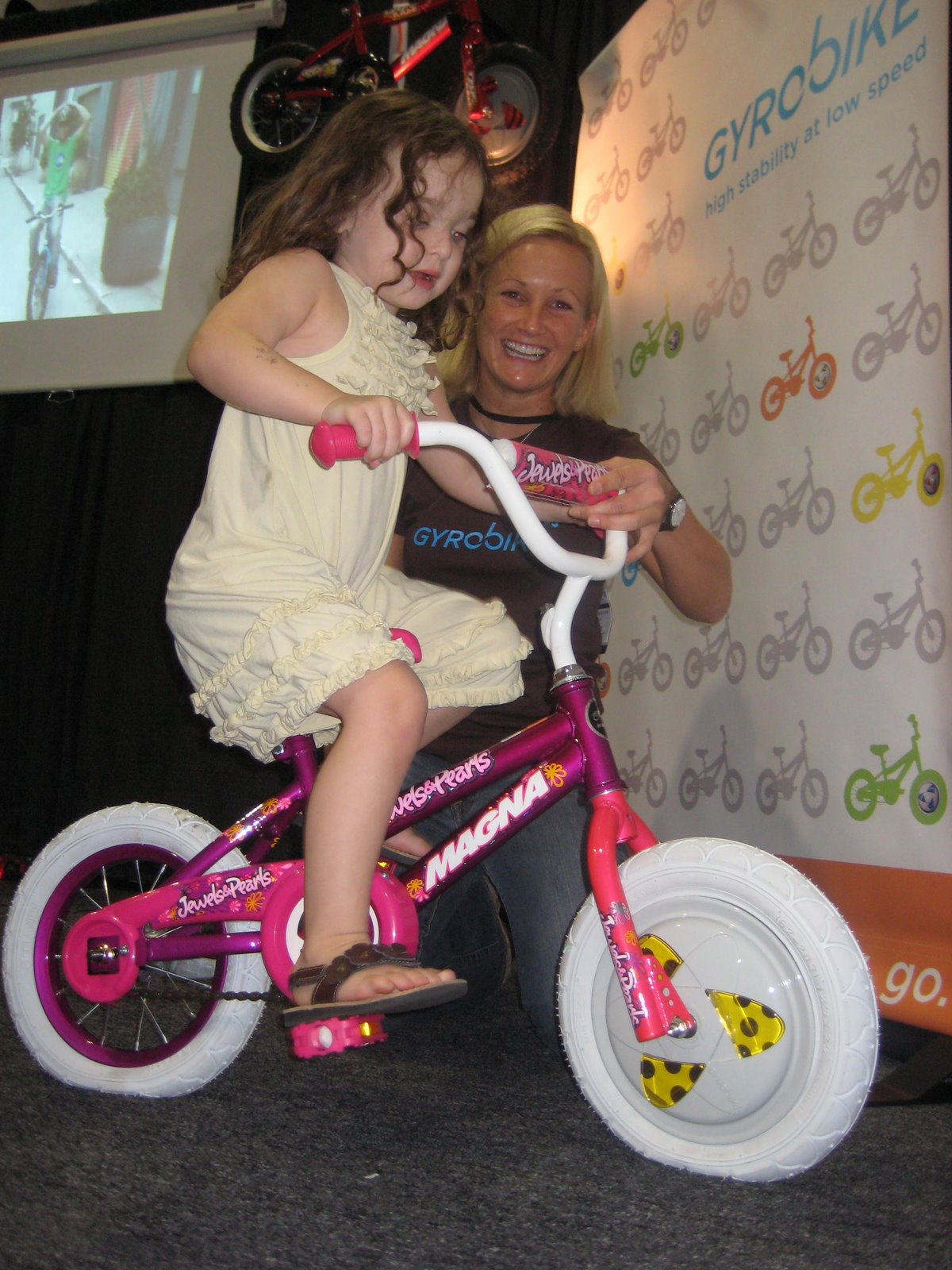
A child riding the Gyrobike

A Jyrobike (formerly known as Gyrobike) is a bicycle with a special front wheel designed to make balancing a bicycle easier. It was manufactured and sold by a company of the same name.

The front wheel contains a rotating flywheel driven by a rechargeable-battery-powered motor that spins at high RPMs like a gyroscope. This flywheel spins significantly faster than the front wheel rolls and acts as a gyroscope, even when the bike is moving slowly, such as when the rider is starting. The flywheel causes the front wheel to respond to a lean by precessing, that is the front wheel turns toward the direction of the lean, which can help provide stability at low speeds, whether riding straight or turning.

== History ==
The inventors of the technology which the original Gyrowheel was based on were Debbie Sperling, Hannah Murnen, Nathan Sigworth, and Augusta Niles, who conceived and tested the concept between 2004 and 2007 as part of a graduate project at the Thayer School of Engineering. Their invention won the 2006 Break Through Award from Popular Mechanics.

In 2010 Daniella Reichstetter, a fellow Dartmouth student, licensed the technology from the inventors and set up a company based in San Francisco, USA called The Gyrobike Inc. The company launched a working model based on the initial invention, called Gyrowheel, which was a stand-alone front wheel toy accessory that replaced the conventional bicycle front wheel. The company communicated ‘once attached, Gyrowheel transforms a normal bicycle into a Gyrobike’. This message led to confusion because the inventors never engineered a complete Gyrobike bicycle nor did the company sell bicycles or Gyrobikes, but only the front wheel. Gyrowheel was manufactured in 12" and 16" wheel sizes, and was marketed as a toy accessory for children.

Gyrowheel was rated a “Top Toy” of Toy Fair 2010 in New York by industry.

In October 2013 UK-based entrepreneur Robert Bodill acquired the intellectual property rights, then raised capital funding and set up Jyrobike Limited in December 2013. The Gyrobike trademark is owned by Jyrobike Limited, which holds global patents for a “system for providing gyroscopic stabilization to a two- wheeled vehicle”, protecting the invention.

In 2014, Jyrobike launched a Kickstarter campaign that raised $185,818 from 872 supporters. On November 25, 2014, Team Jyrobike announced a 9-month delay in delivering bikes. That was their last update. As of July, 2019, the jyrobike.com url is no longer active.

== See also ==
- Balance bicycle
- Bicycle and motorcycle dynamics
- Bicycle safety
- Gyrocar
