= Balance bike =

Learner's bicycle without pedals

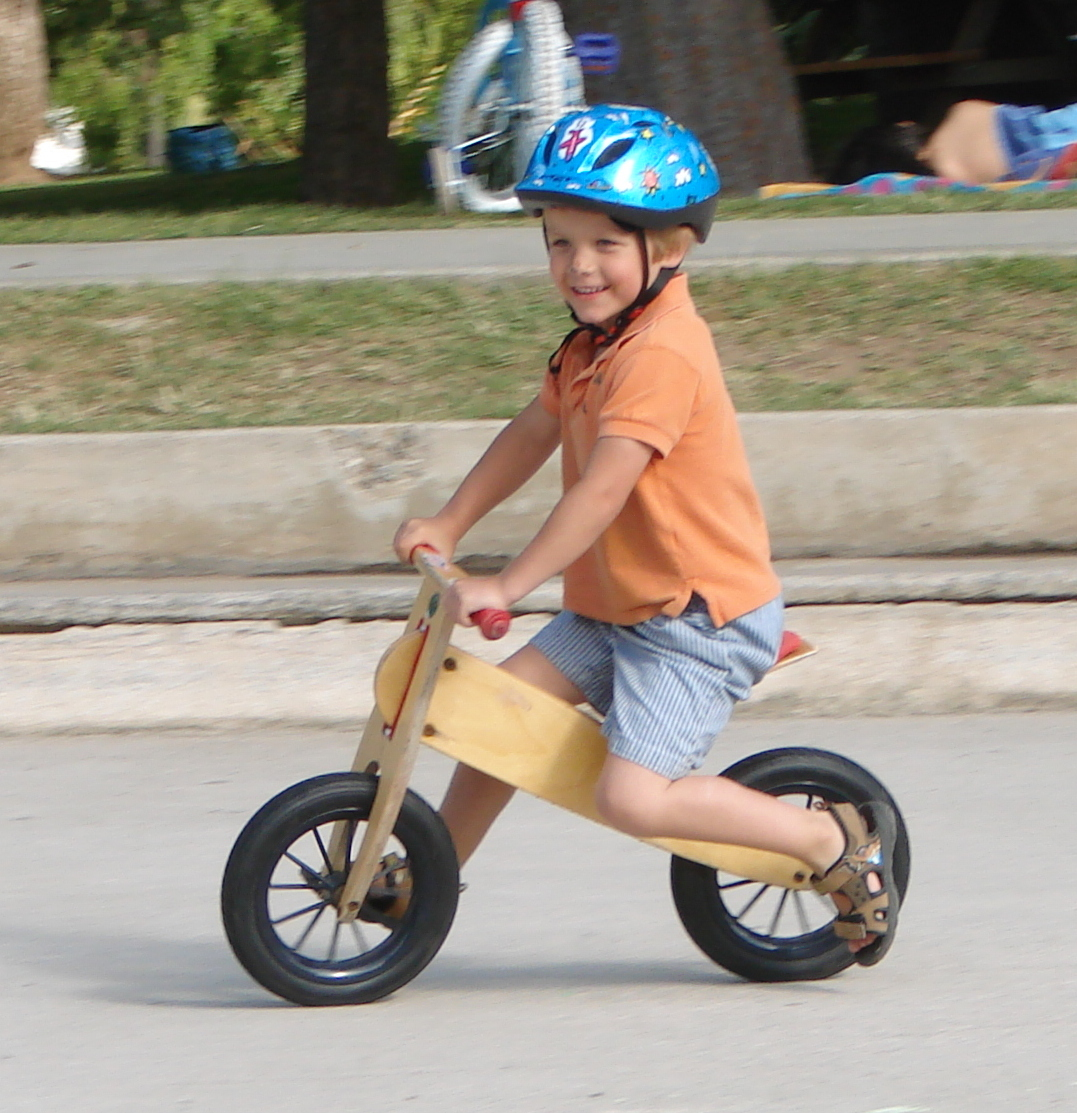
A wooden balance bike

A balance bike (or run bike) is a bicycle without pedals that learners propel by pushing their feet against the ground. By allowing children to focus on developing their sense of balance and coordination before introducing pedalling, balance bikes enable independent riding more quickly than training wheels.

== History ==
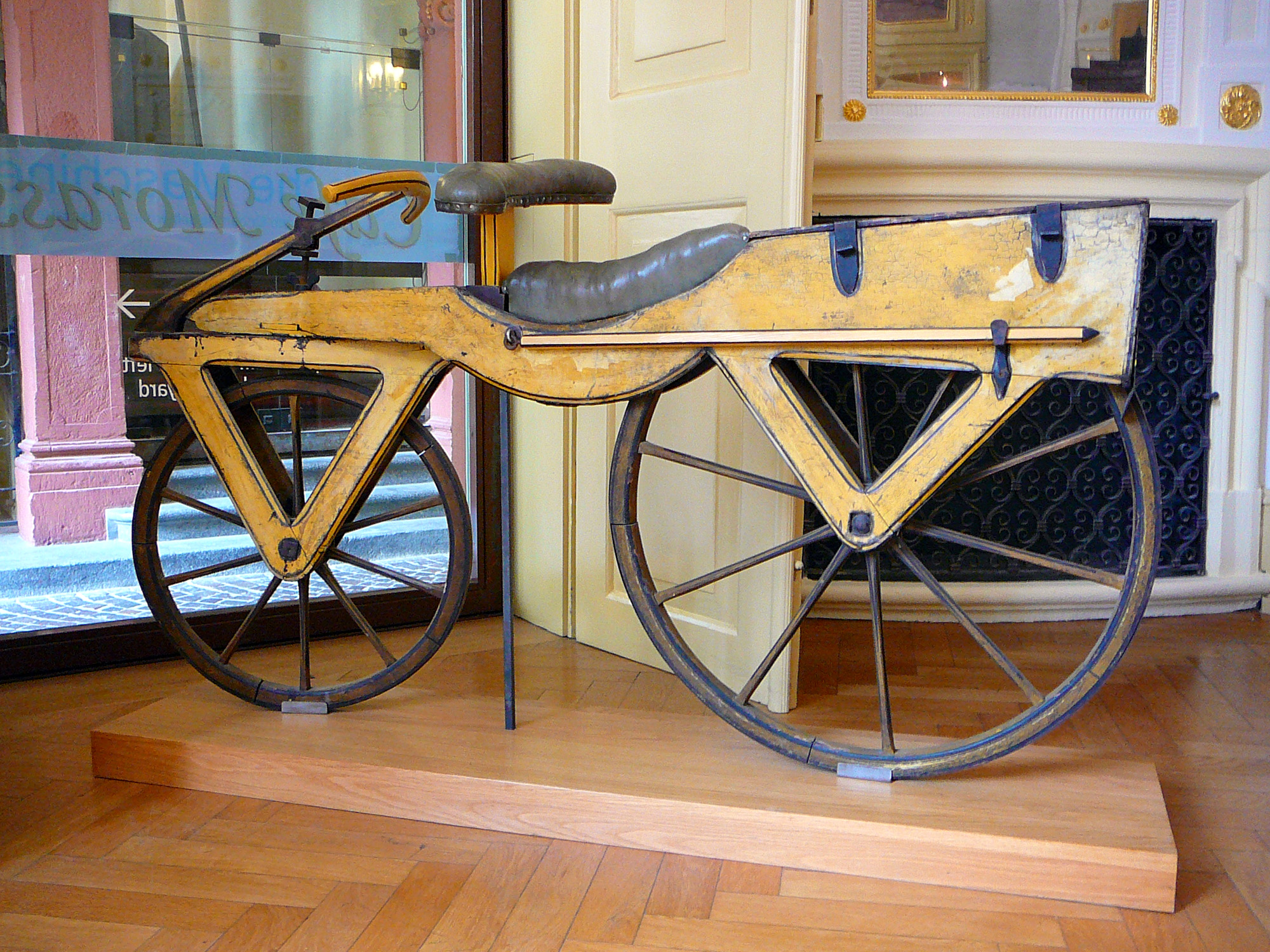
A dandy horse (built c. 1820)

Balance bikes descend from the earliest two-wheeled bicycle, a Laufmaschine or dandy horse, invented by Karl Drais in 1817. These early balance bikes consisted of a simple wooden frame with two wheels and no pedals, and were designed for adult use.

During the twentieth century, children typically learned to ride a bicycle with lateral training wheels. In 1997, German designer Rolf Mertens introduced the first commercially produced Laufrad (running bike) under the brand KOKUA Bikes. Children's balance bikes quickly gained popularity in Europe in the 2000s and spread elsewhere in the world by the early 2010s. Balance bikes are now a common tool used to teach young children how to ride a bike.

== Learning method ==
Balance bikes are aimed at children between the ages of two and five, though children sometimes begin as young as eighteen months. The rider first walks the bicycle while standing over the saddle, then while sitting in the saddle. Eventually, the rider feels comfortable enough to run or scoot while riding the bicycle, then to lift both feet off the ground, pushing and gliding while balancing on two wheels. Increased speed results in reduced foot contact with the ground and children are able to glide for longer distances.

== Benefits ==
Children learn to ride independently more quickly with a balance bike because they learn to balance and countersteer first, and to pedal later. Balance bikes require greater postural control and therefore enable earlier mastery of a pedal bike.

By contrast, training wheels slow learning because children become too dependent on them, acquiring bad habits. Since training wheels prevent the bike from leaning, they prevent countersteering, so that, as with a tricycle, children learn to turn the handlebars the wrong way, which must be unlearned later.

Balance bikes can also benefit riders with disabilities or reduced mobility. Experience on a balance bike allows children with cerebral palsy greater independence. They are also an accessible means of riding for children with autism.

While balance bikes are most commonly used with children, they have also been recommended as learning aids for adults.

== Features ==
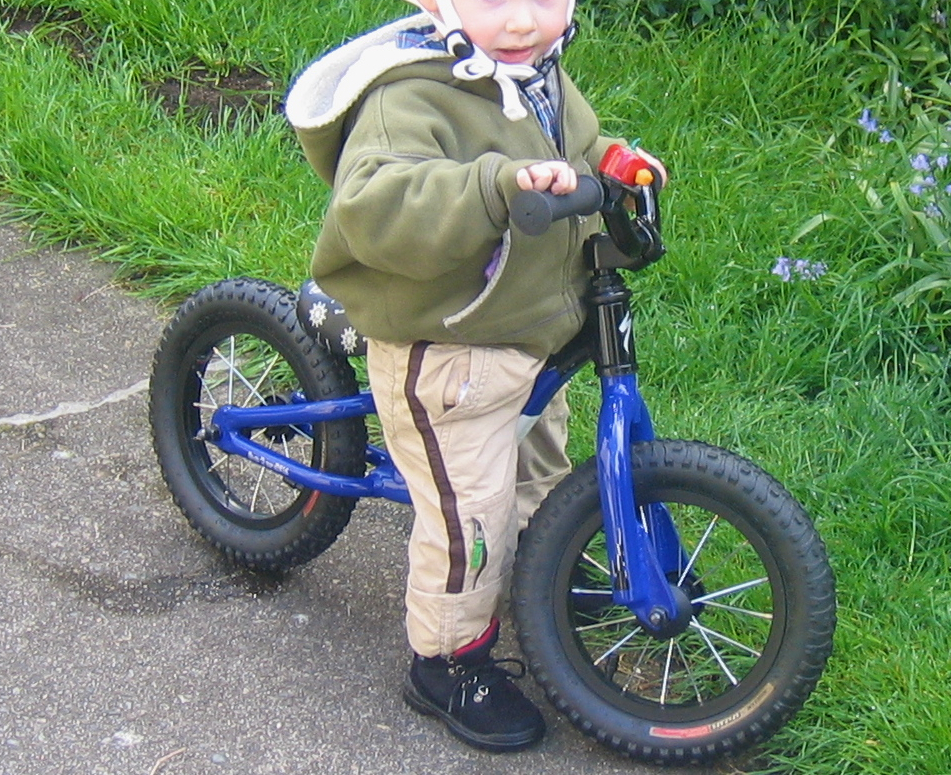
Toddler on metal balance bike

A balance bike is designed to be lightweight and easy for young children to manoeuvre. It must be small enough for the rider to be able to walk the bicycle while sitting comfortably in the saddle, putting both feet flat on the ground. This design helps children develop balance and coordination skills by allowing them to focus on steering and balancing without the added complexity of pedalling.

Balance bikes are typically available with wheels 12 inches (300 mm) in diameter for riders of about two to five years; or 14 inches (360 mm) for riders three years and older.

=== Weight ===
Balance bikes can be made out of aluminium, steel, plastic, or wood. Researchers have found that a lightweight frame is key to an effective and practical design. Both children and parents need to be able to safely carry the bicycle. To reduce weight, balance bikes are most commonly purpose-built, but it is also possible to teach a child to balance on a small gearless bicycle with the pedals removed.

=== Brakes ===
As young riders gain confidence and speed, the ability to stop effectively becomes crucial. The first balance bikes did not include brakes. Designers had assumed that very young children would not understand how to use brakes, but later found that smaller brake levers allow them to stop successfully. Accidents occurring when riders rely solely on their feet to stop the bike are one of the most common causes of injury when using a balance bike.

Manufacturers initially introduced a micro-reach brake lever designed for small hands as an optional extra. They have been increasingly included as a standard feature on most balance bikes since the early 2010s, especially following the work of British designer and competitive cyclist Isla Rowntree.

=== Saddle ===
An ideal balance bike saddle is designed with a scooped shape to ensure that children remain secure while gliding and scooting, both backwards and forwards. Whereas traditional bicycles use pedalling to propel the rider forward, a balance bike relies on the pushing motion of the rider's feet. A scooped saddle prevents the child from sliding off the front of the bike.

Balance bikes typically have adjustable seat heights, allowing the bike to grow with the child.

=== Narrow profile ===
Since children swing their legs back and forth while riding, designers of balance bikes remove all protrusions and ensure a sleek profile to minimize the risk of accidental contact between the rider's legs and the bike's components, reducing the risk of injury. This is achieved through a simplified frame, narrow hubs, rounded wheel nuts, and brakes placed in line with the frame. Some balance bikes include a footrest, but omitting this reduces the risk of children sustaining bruises.

=== Handlebars ===
To ensure a proper grip for young riders, the handlebars and grips of balance bikes are designed with a small diameter. This feature allows children to wrap their whole hand around the grips, promoting a secure and comfortable hold.

=== Steering limiter ===
Many balance bikes are equipped with a steering limiter to maintain proper handlebar alignment. This safety mechanism restricts the handlebars from twisting excessively and ensures that the brake cable remains intact.

== See also ==
- Jyrobike
- Kick bike
