= Velocipede =

Human-powered land vehicle

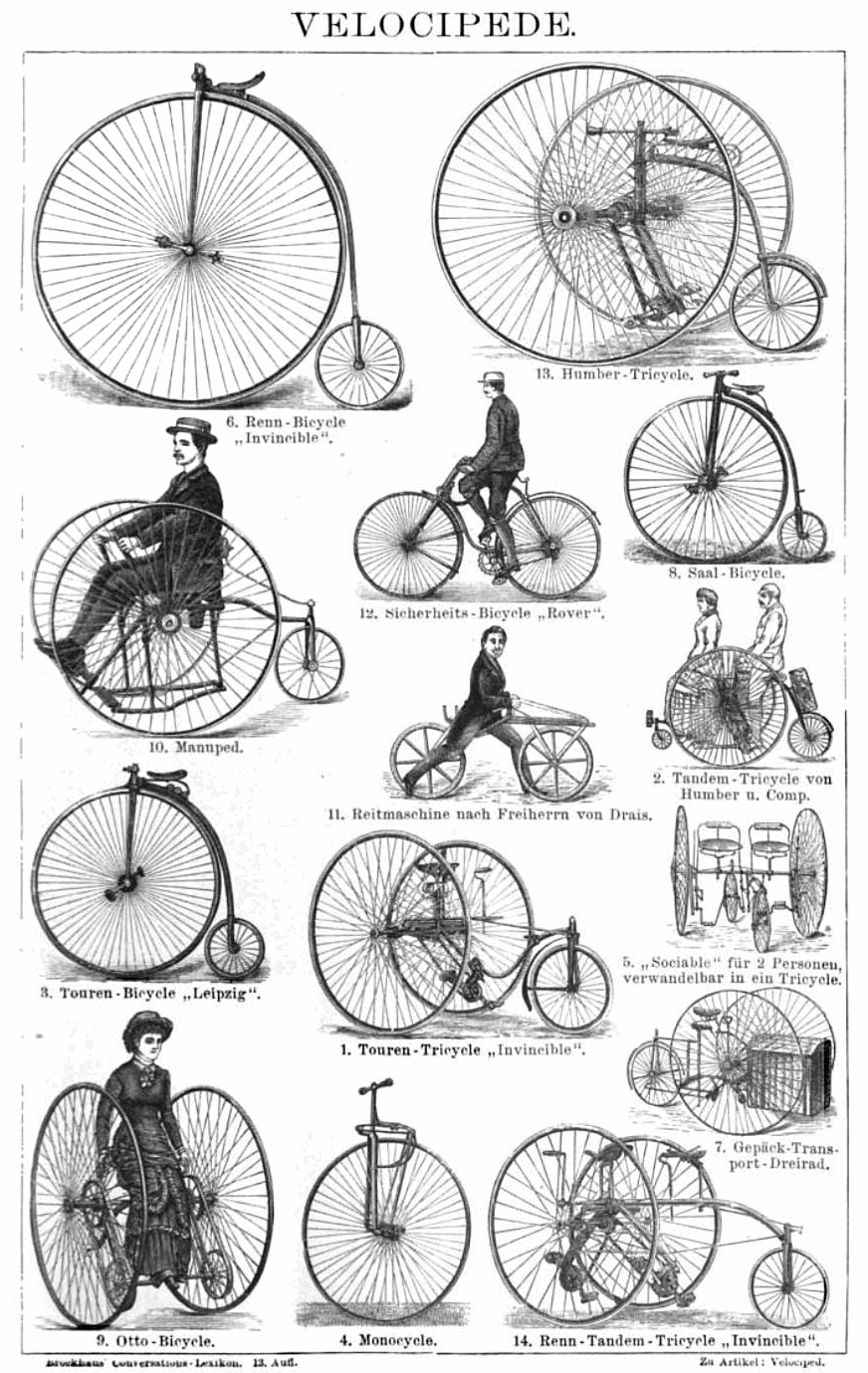
Velocipedes from an 1887 German encyclopedia. Among the examples shown are a penny farthing and a boneshaker.

A velocipede (/vəˈlɒsəpiːd/, veh-LOSS-ih-PEED) is a human-powered land vehicle with one or more wheels. The most common type of velocipede today is the bicycle.

The term was probably coined by Karl von Drais in French as vélocipède for the French translation of his advertising leaflet for his version of the Laufmaschine, also now called a dandy horse, which he had developed in 1817. It is ultimately derived from the Latin velox, veloc- 'swift' + pes, ped- 'foot'. The term velocipede is today mainly used as a collective term for the different forerunners of the monowheel, the unicycle, the bicycle, the dicycle, the tricycle and the quadracycle developed between 1817 and 1880.

Velocipede refers especially to the forerunner of the modern bicycle—taken to extreme form in the exaggerated penny-farthing—that was propelled, like a modern tricycle, by pedals attached by cranks to the front axle, before the invention of bicycles using geared chain, belt or shaft drives powering the rear.

== History ==
Among the early velocipedes there were designs with one, two, three, four, and even five wheels. Some two-wheeled designs had pedals mounted on the front wheel, while three- and four-wheeled designs sometimes used treadles and levers to drive the rear wheels.

The earliest usable and much-copied velocipede was created by the German Karl Drais and called a Laufmaschine, German for 'running machine', which he first rode on 12 June 1817. He obtained a patent in January 1818. This was the world's first balance bicycle and quickly became popular in the United Kingdom and France, where it was sometimes called a draisine (German and English), draisienne (French), a vélocipède (French), a swiftwalker, a dandy horse (as it was very popular among dandies) or a hobby horse. It was made entirely of wood and metal. It was sometimes ridden for long distances despite the bad condition of the roads at the time.

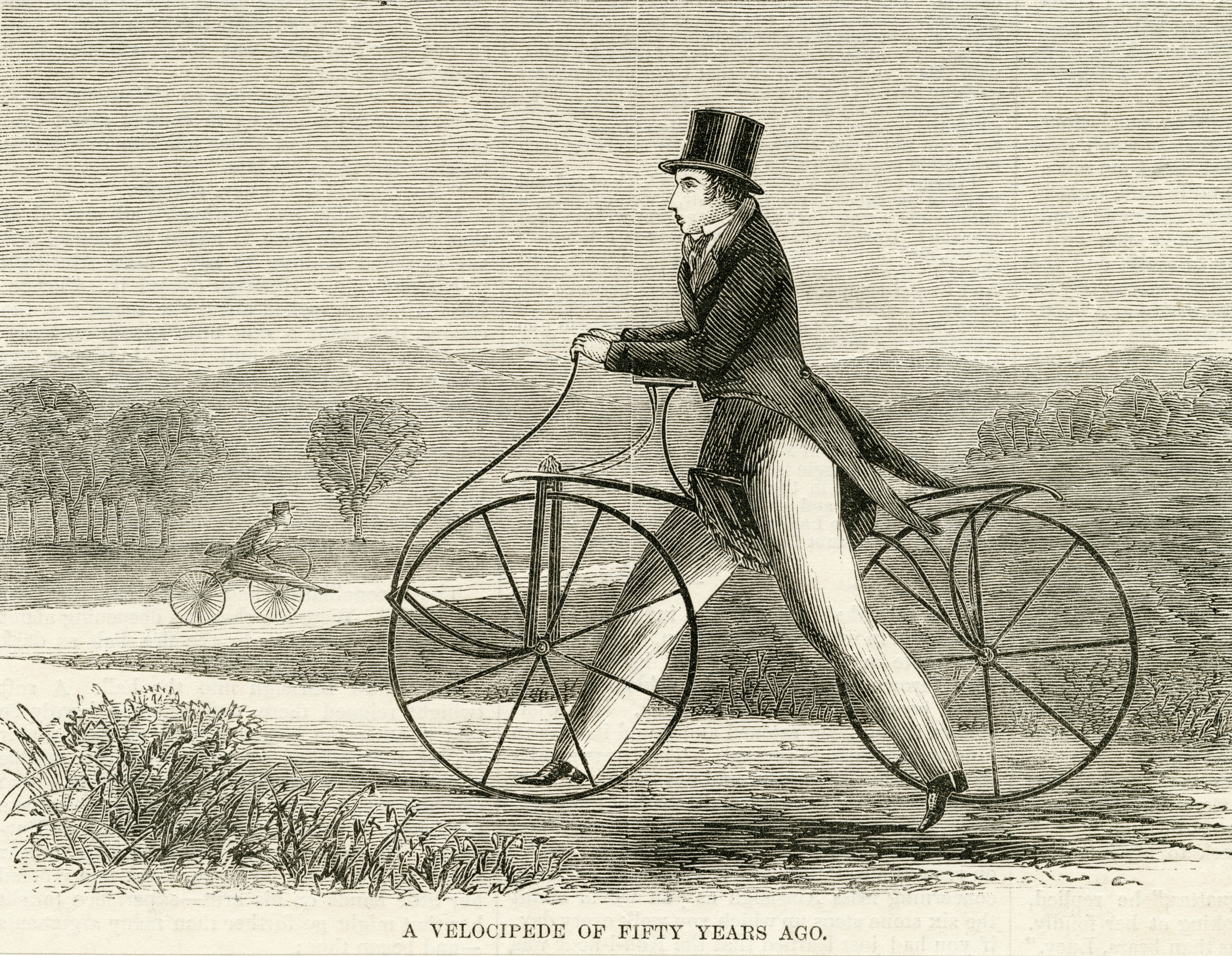
"A Velocipede of Fifty Years Ago," 1869

It was almost 40 years until velocipede came into common usage as a generic term, with the launch of the first pedal-equipped bicycle, developed by Pierre Michaux, Pierre Lallement and the Olivier brothers in the 1860s. The Michaux company was the first to mass-produce the velocipede, from 1857 to 1871. That French design was sometimes called the boneshaker, since it was also made entirely of wood, then later with metal tires. That feature, in combination with the cobblestone roads of the day, made for an extremely uncomfortable ride.

Velocipedes became a fad, and indoor riding academies, similar to roller rinks, could be found in large cities. In 1891 L'Industrie Vélocipédique (Cycling Industry) magazine described La Société Parisienne de constructions Velo as 'the oldest velocipede manufacturer in France', having been founded in 1876 by M. Reynard, and awarded the 'Diploma of honour' at the Exposition Universelle (1878) (World's Fair).

During the 1870s advances in metallurgy led to the development of the first all-metal velocipedes. The pedals were still attached directly to the front wheel, which became larger and larger as makers realised that the larger the wheel, the farther you could travel with one rotation of the pedals. Solid rubber tires and the long spokes of the large front wheel provided a much smoother ride than its predecessor. This type of velocipede was the first one to be called a bicycle ("two wheel"), and its shape led to the nickname penny-farthing in the United Kingdom. They enjoyed a great popularity among young men in the 1880s who could afford them.

While young men were risking their necks on the high wheels, ladies and dignified gentlemen such as doctors and clergymen of the 1880s favoured the less risky tricycle. Many innovations for tricycles eventually found their way into the automobile, such as rack and pinion steering, the differential, and band brakes, the forerunners to drum brakes.

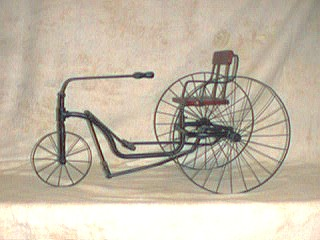
An 1880 Velocipede

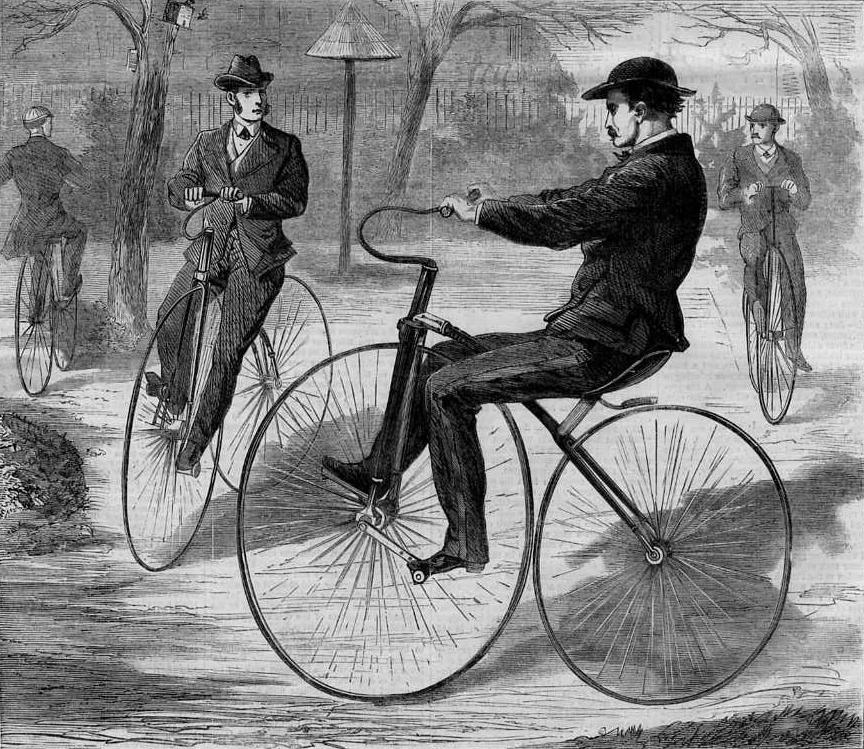
The American Velocipede, 1868, a wood engraving from Harper's Weekly

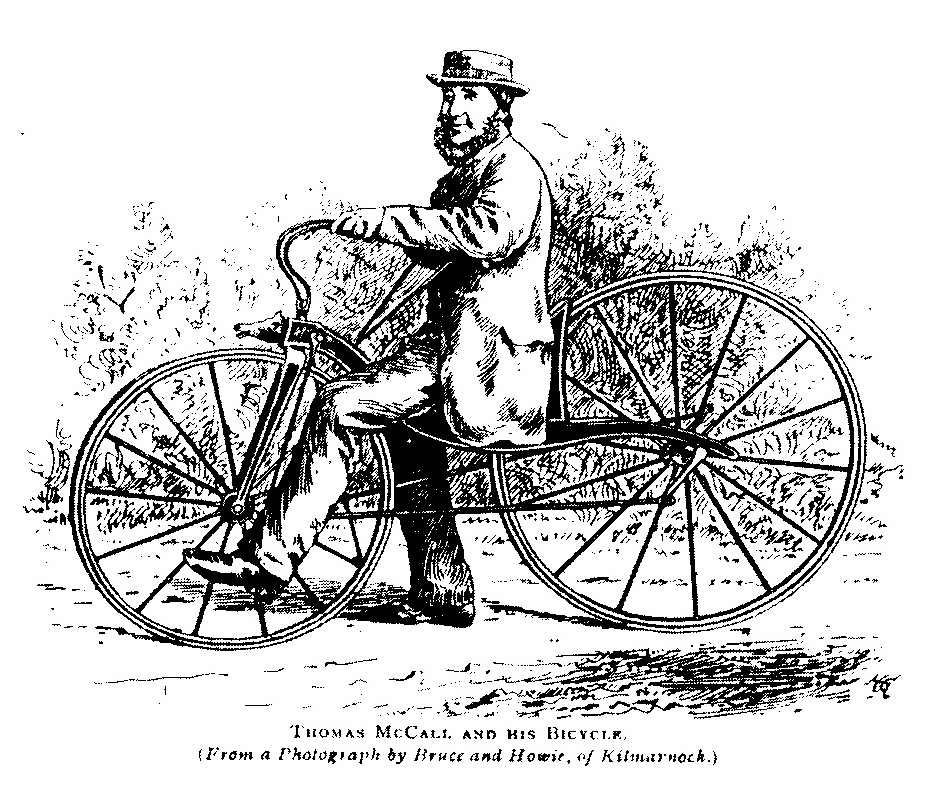
Thomas McCall in 1869 on his velocipede

== Boneshaker ==
Boneshaker, or bone-shaker, is a name dating from the 1860s for the first type of true bicycle with pedals, which were called velocipedes by their manufacturers. "Boneshaker" referred to the extremely uncomfortable ride, which was caused by the stiff wrought-iron frame and wooden wheels surrounded by tires made of iron.

=== History ===
The so-called "boneshaker" was invented in the 1860s in France and first manufactured by the Michaux company from 1867 to 1869, the time of the first bicycle craze. The boneshaker was copied by many others during that time. It fell out of favor after the summer of 1869 and was replaced in 1870 with the type of bicycle called "ordinary", "high-wheel", or "penny-farthing".

Few original boneshakers exist today, most having been melted for scrap metal during World War I. Those that do surface command high prices, typically up to about $5,000 US.

=== Design ===
The construction of the boneshaker was similar to the dandy horse: wooden wheels with iron tires and a framework of wrought iron. As the name implies it was extremely uncomfortable, but the discomfort was somewhat ameliorated by a long flat spring that supported the saddle and absorbed some of the shocks from rough road surfaces. The boneshaker had a brake in the form of a metal lever that pressed a wooden pad against the rear wheel.

The front wheel axle ran in lubricated bronze bearings, and some had small lubrication tanks that would wick oil from soaked lamb's wool into the bearings to help them run smoothly. Like the High Wheel bicycles that became popular later in the 19th century, boneshakers were front-wheel drive, but in comparison they had smaller wheels (only about 1 m), and were heavy, with a lightweight model weighing 14 kilograms (30 lb) or more.

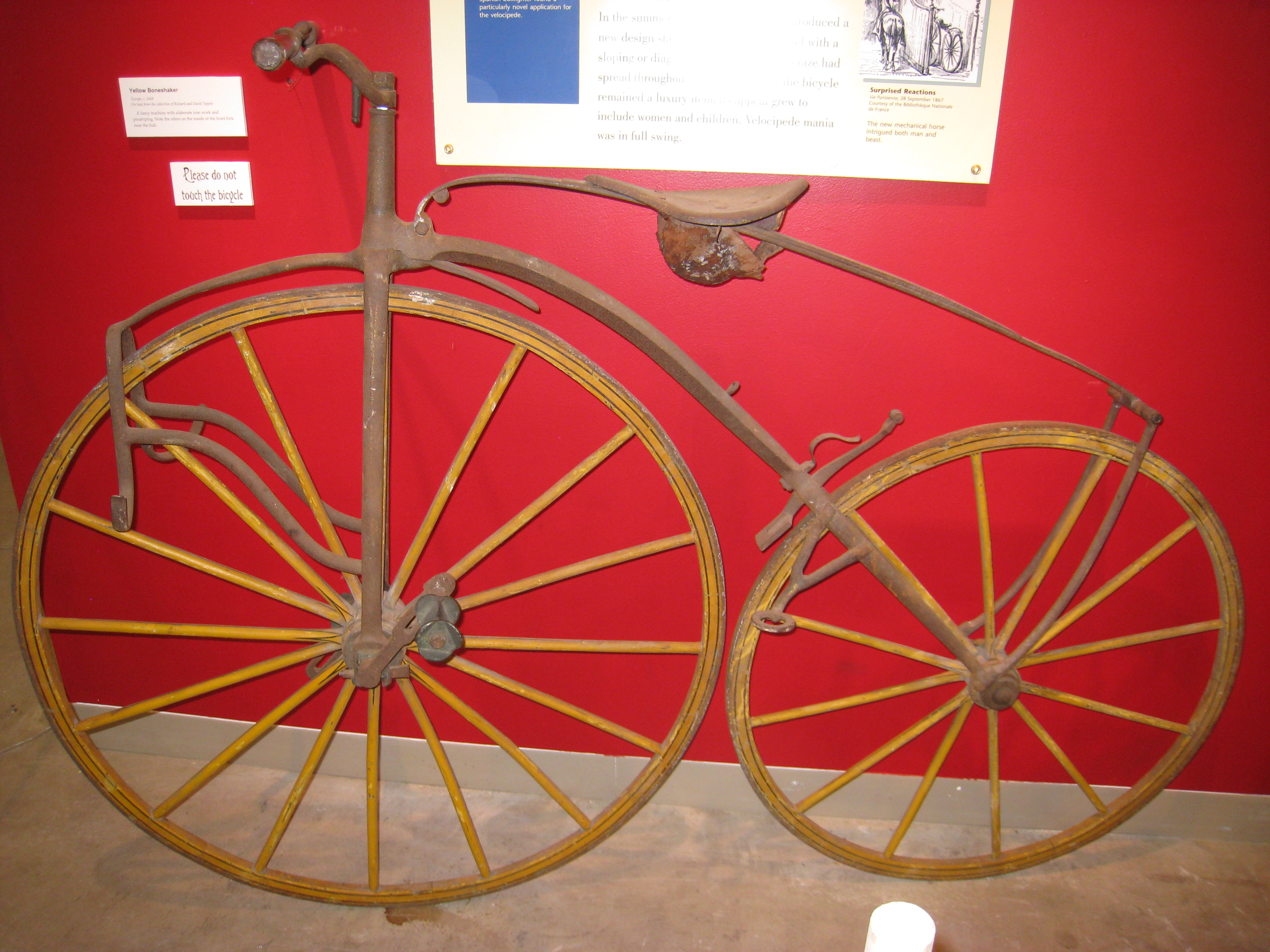
European "boneshaker" bicycle, circa 1868.

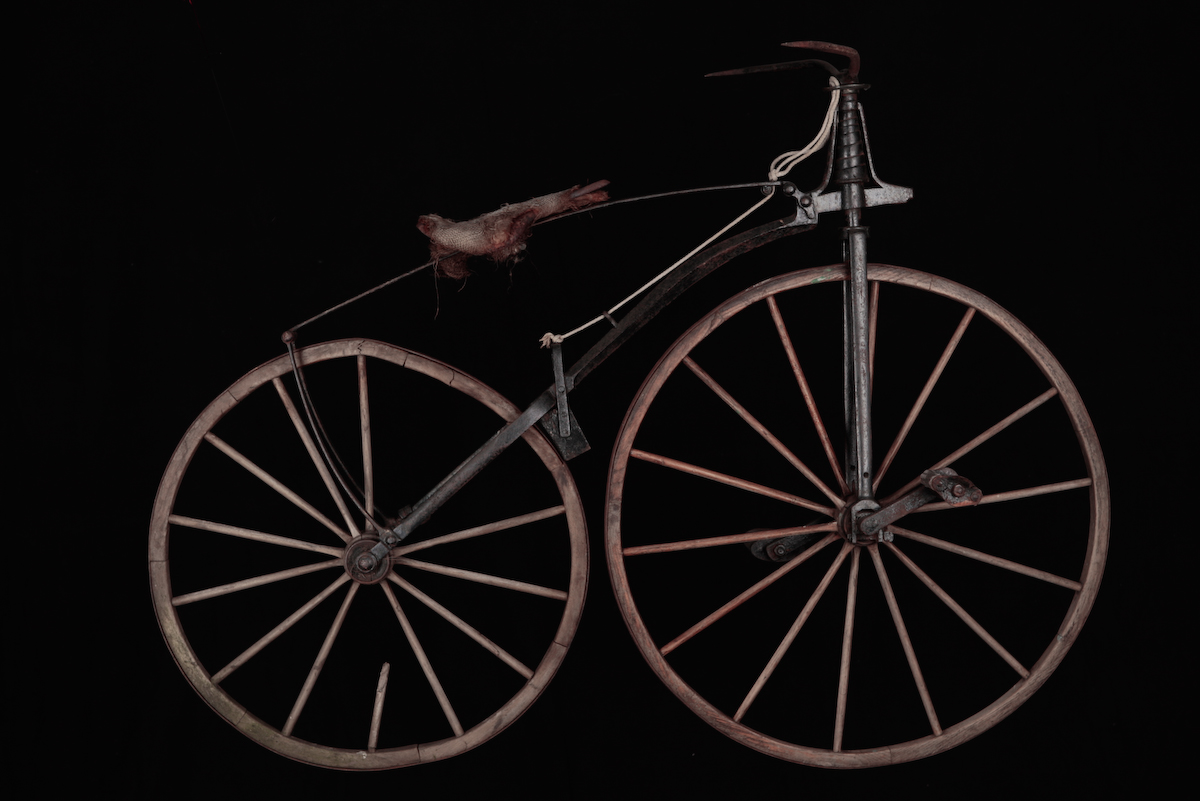
The Michaux velocipede had a straight downtube and a spoon brake.

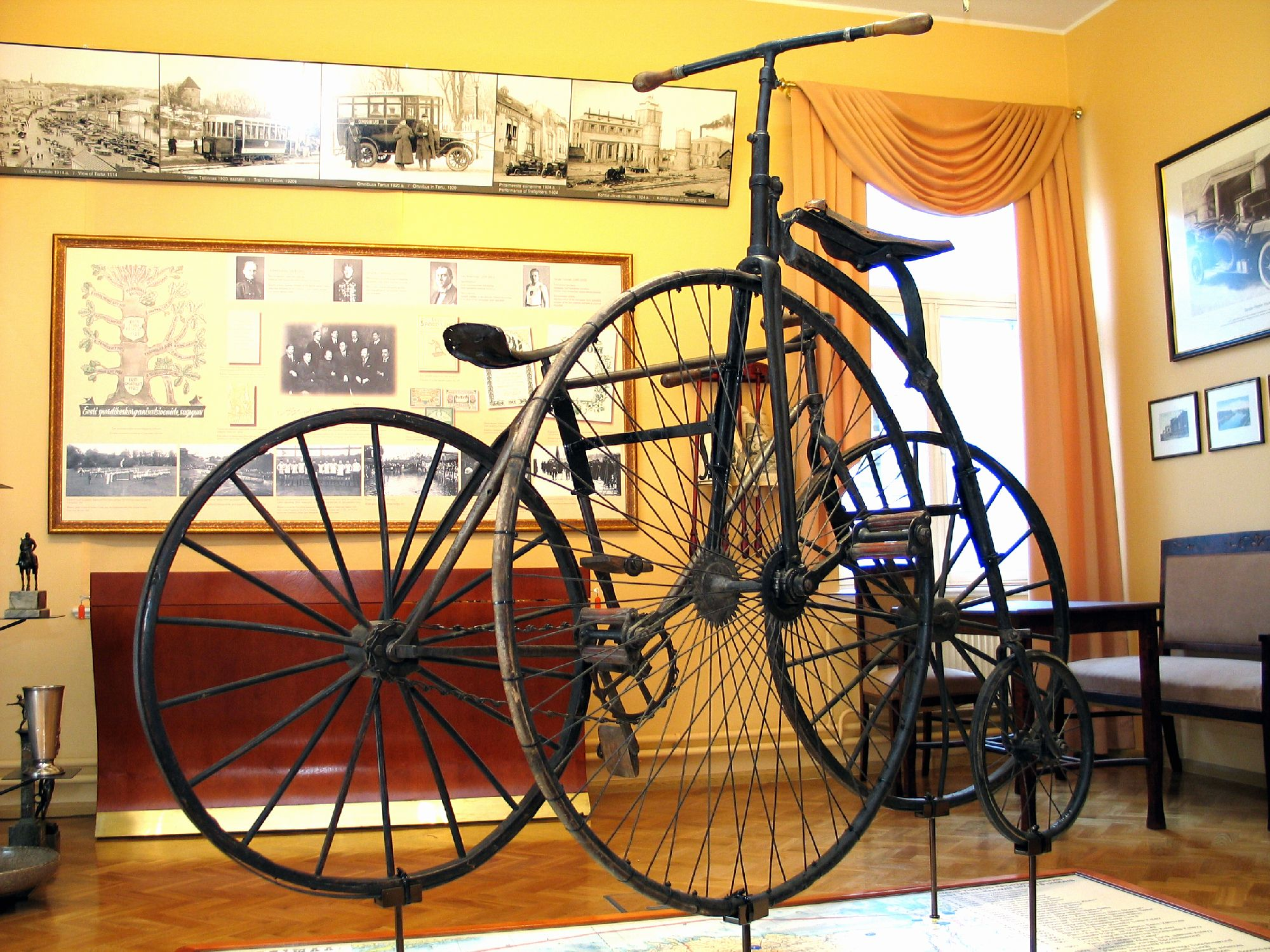
The penny-farthing at the Estonian Sports and Olympic Museum in Tartu, Estonia.

== In railroad use ==
Four-wheeled self-propelled conveyances first appeared on British railways as early as 1843. The familiar four-wheeled self-propelled handcar which evolved from them was designed to be operated by a single person, with a provision for more efficient operation by two.

A self-propelled three wheeled conveyance operated by a single person appeared in the United States in the 1870s and came to be known as a "railway velocipede" or "railroad velocipede". The three-wheel hand-pump rail car's invention is credited to George S. Sheffield of Three Rivers, Michigan. Legend has it that because of inadequate train service to his home, Sheffield built a simple three-wheel car, similar in general look and configuration to a motorcycle with a side car, allowing him to commute 11 kilometres (7 mi) between home and work without having to walk.

While operating it one evening, he discovered a break in the track, and flagged down a night freight train, preventing a possible accident. The railroad rewarded his efforts by bankrolling his invention. Sheffield obtained the patent for his device in 1879, calling it a "velocipede hand car." Originally manufactured by G.S. Sheffield & Co. and later manufactured by Fairbanks, Morse & Company, the Sheffield velocipede remained in use up to World War II.

An animation of a handcar

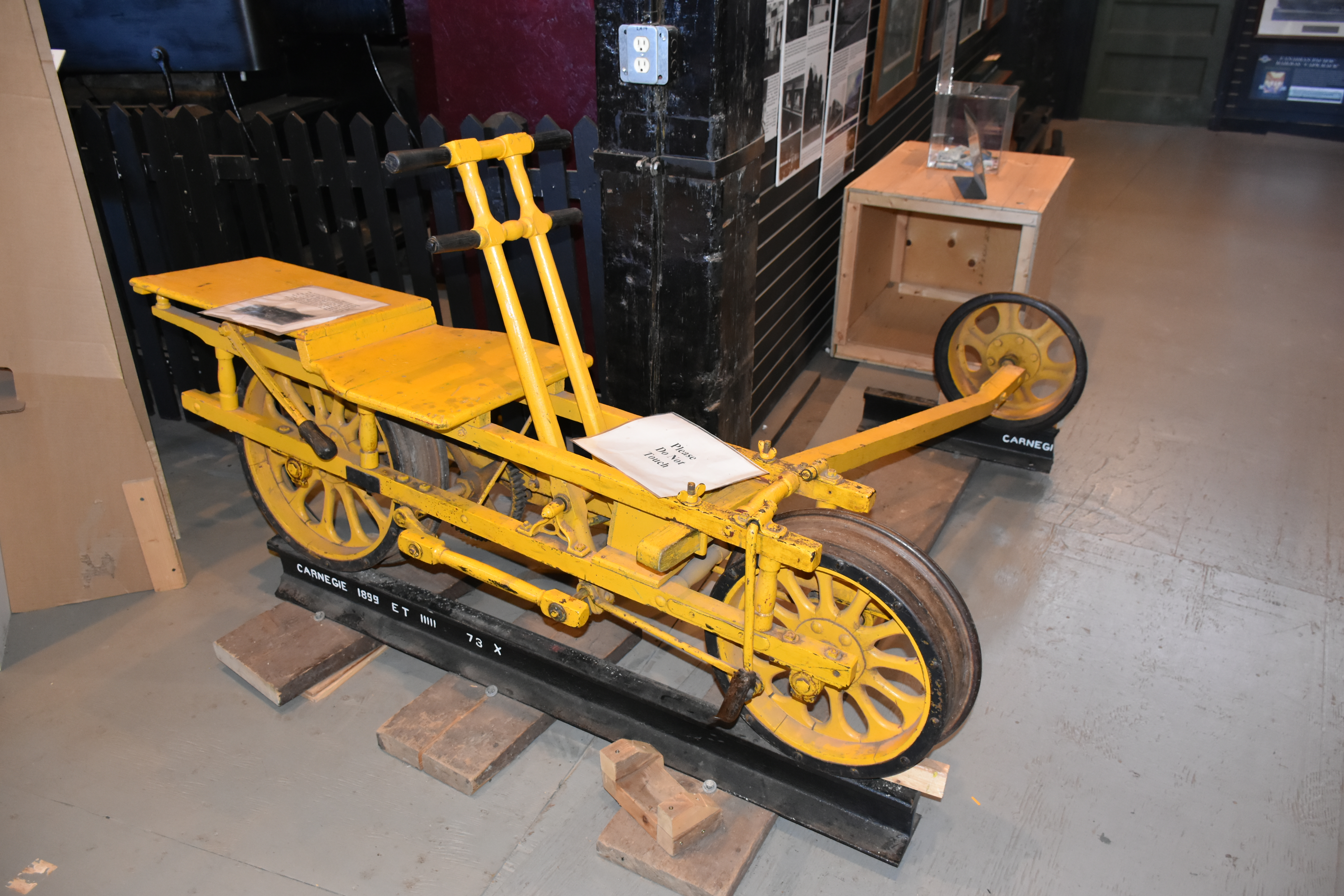
A single-person railroad velocipede on display at the Toronto Railway Historical Association.

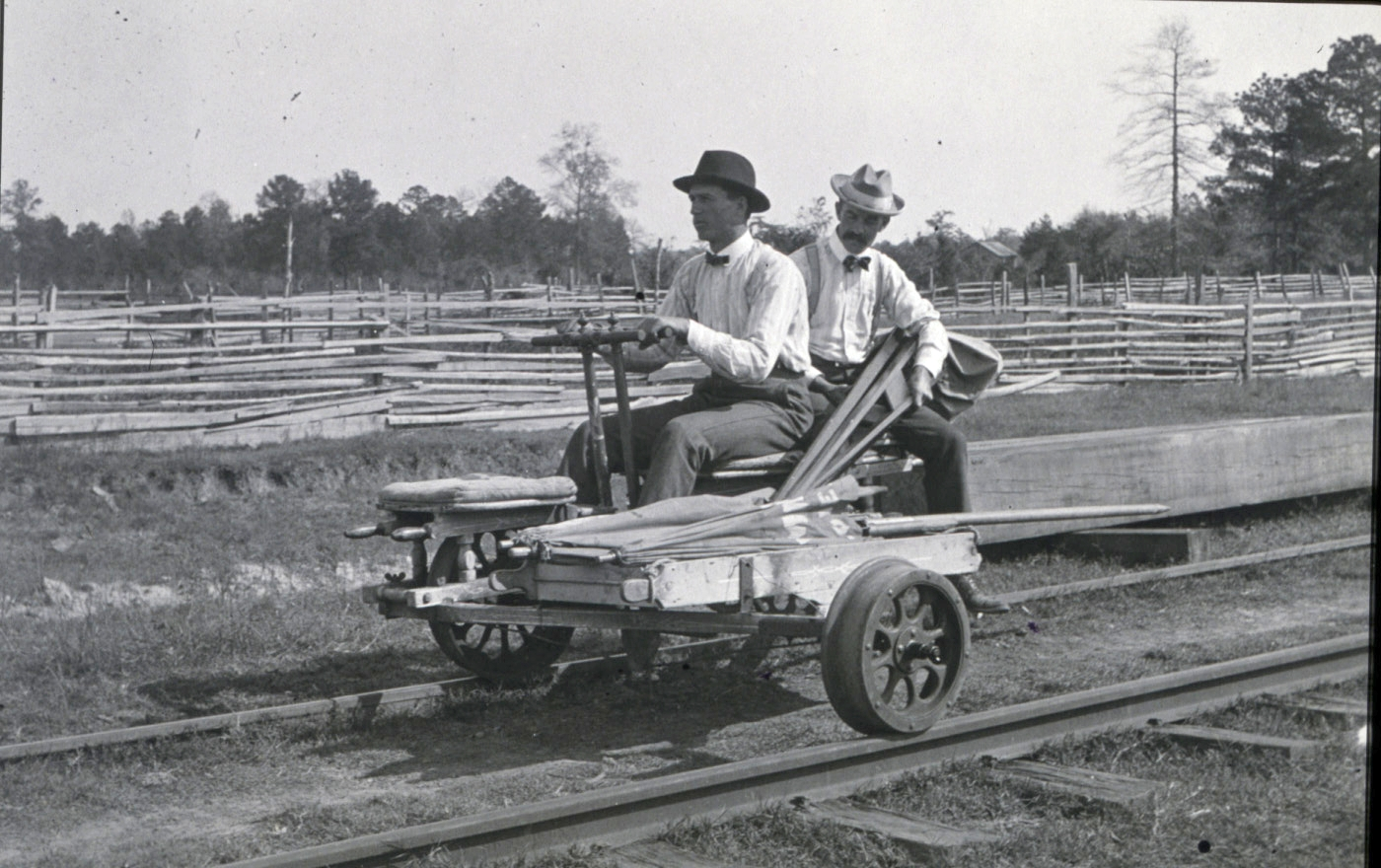
A 3-wheeled Sheffield velocipede on a railroad track. It is operated by hand, pumped by the arms in a back-and-forth rowing motion.

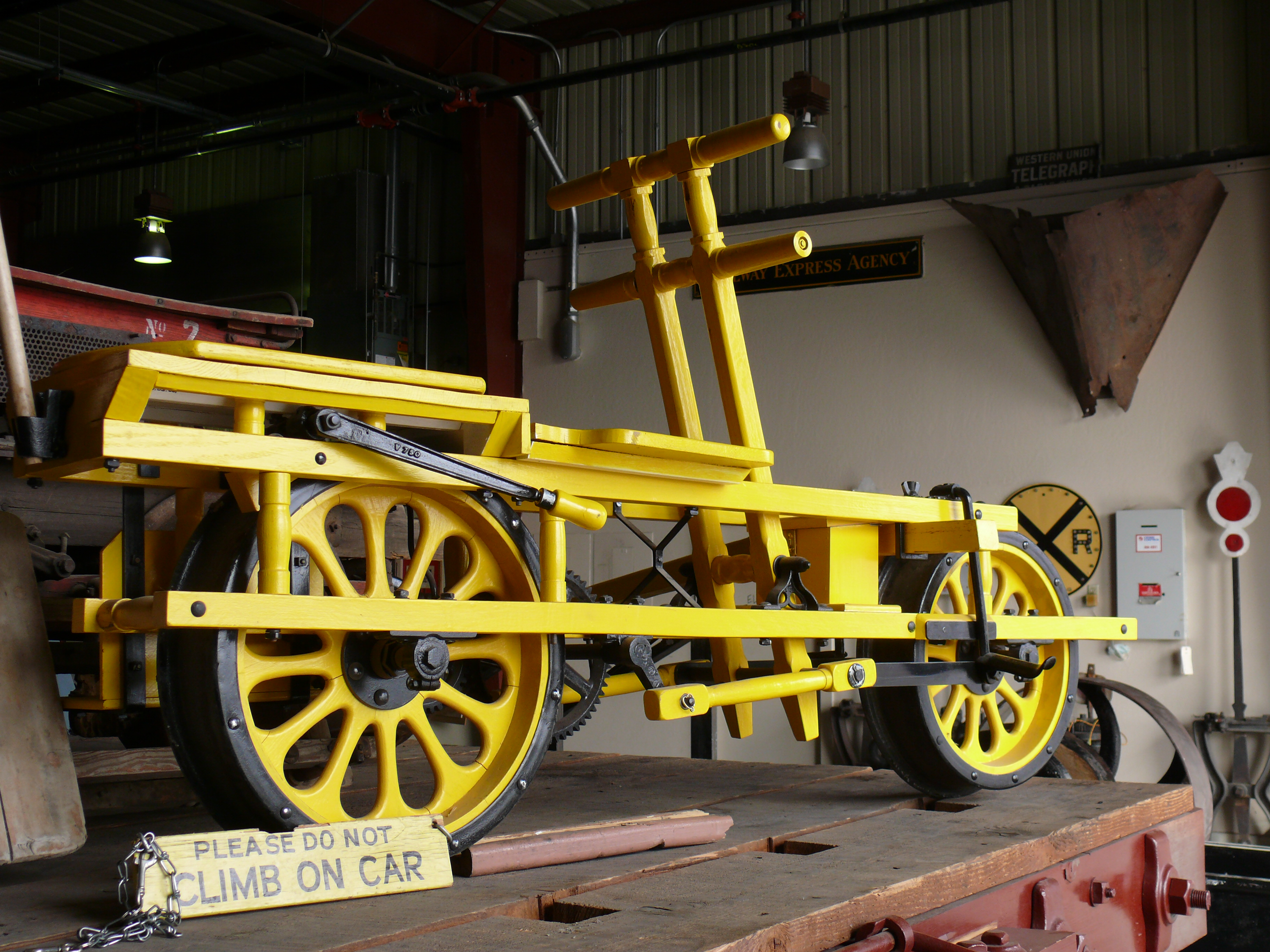
A velocipede or handcar at the Nevada State Railroad Museum

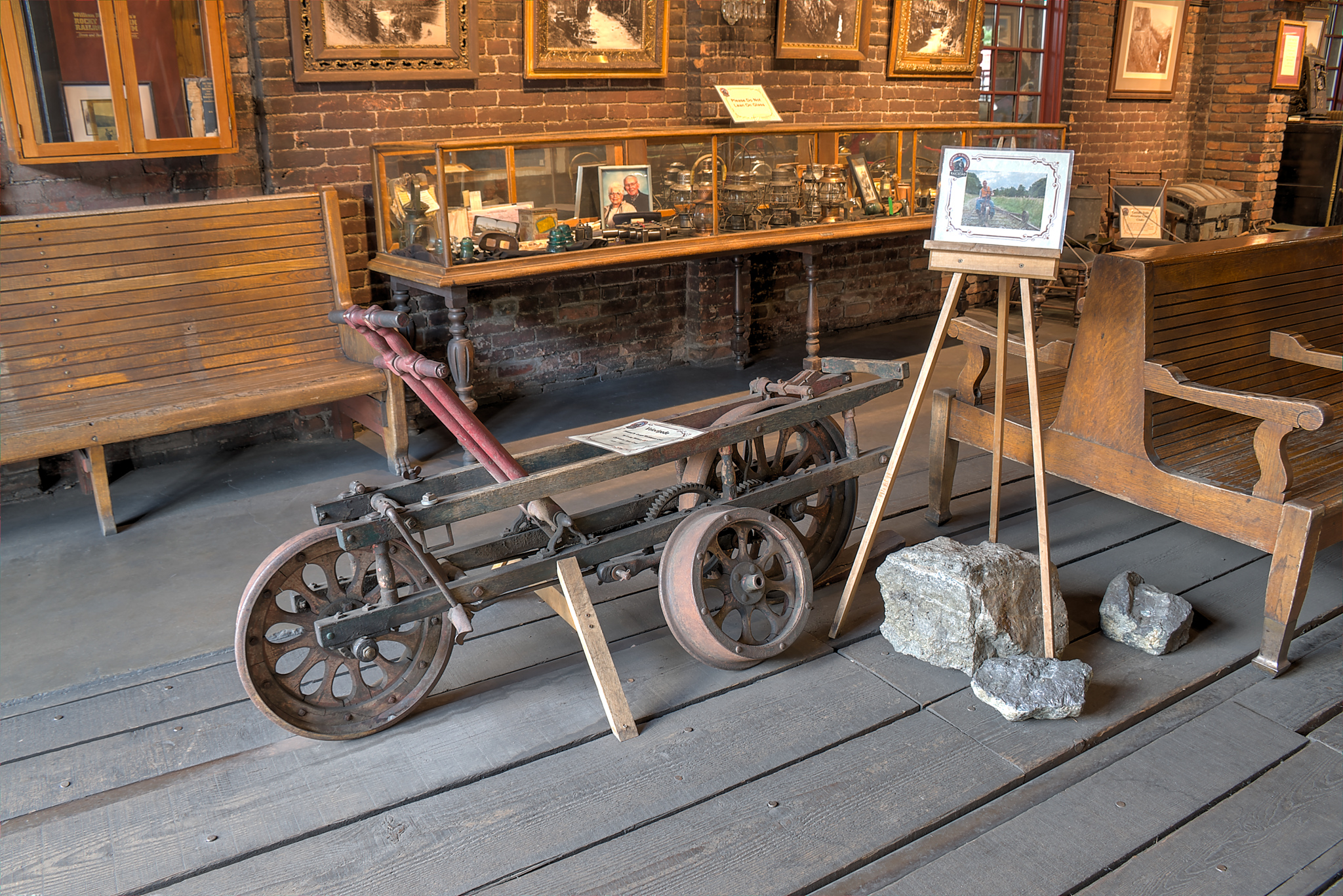
A velocipede at the Durango and Silverton Narrow Gauge Railroad Museum

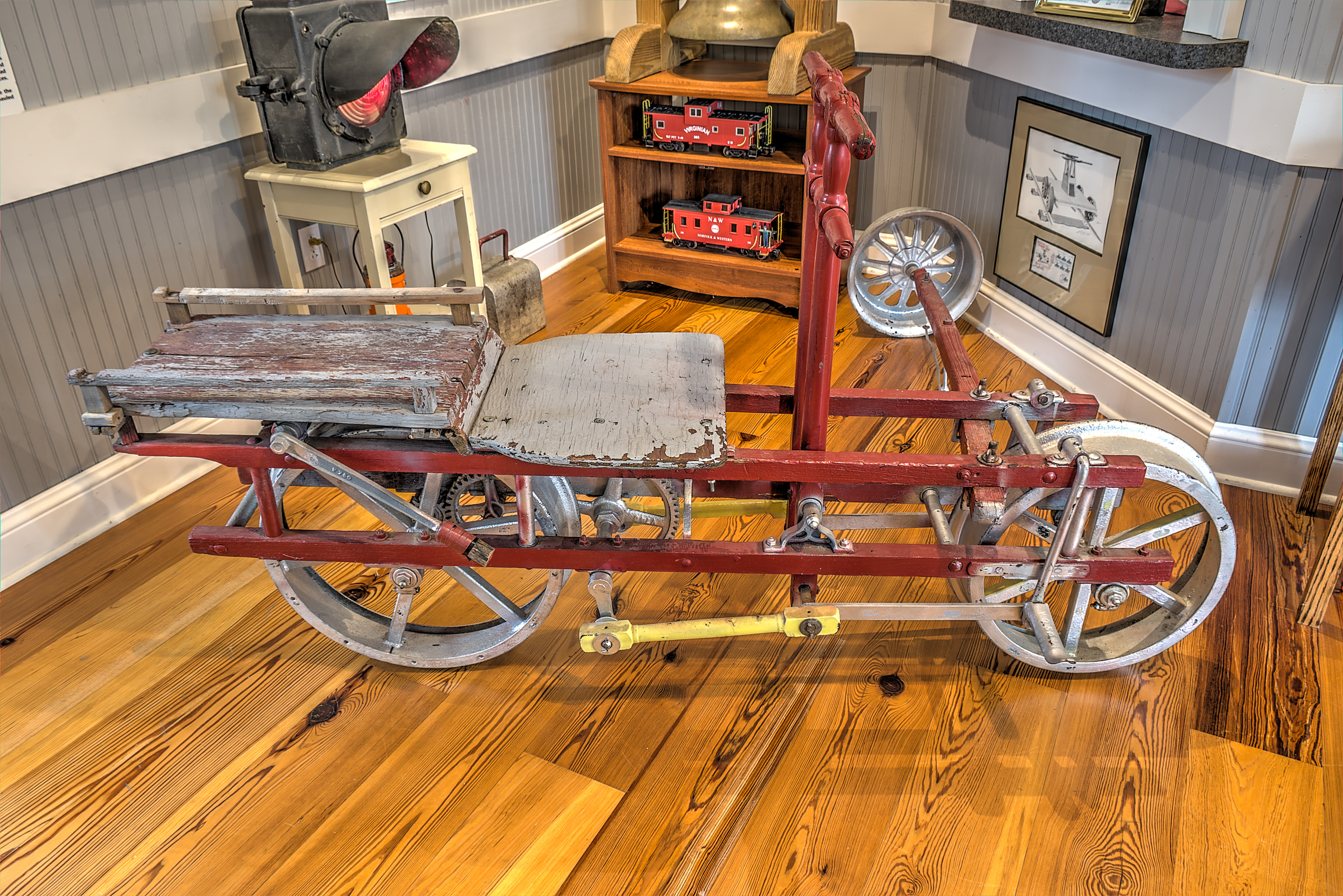
A Sheffield velocipede at the Princeton Railroad Museum in Princeton, WV

== Patents ==
- U.S. patent 59,915 – Velocipede (reissued as RE7972)
- U.S. Patent 382351A VBLOGIPEDE (Lifetime, Expired)

== See also ==
- Outline of cycling
