= Dandy horse =

19th-century human-powered vehicle; predecessor to the bicycle

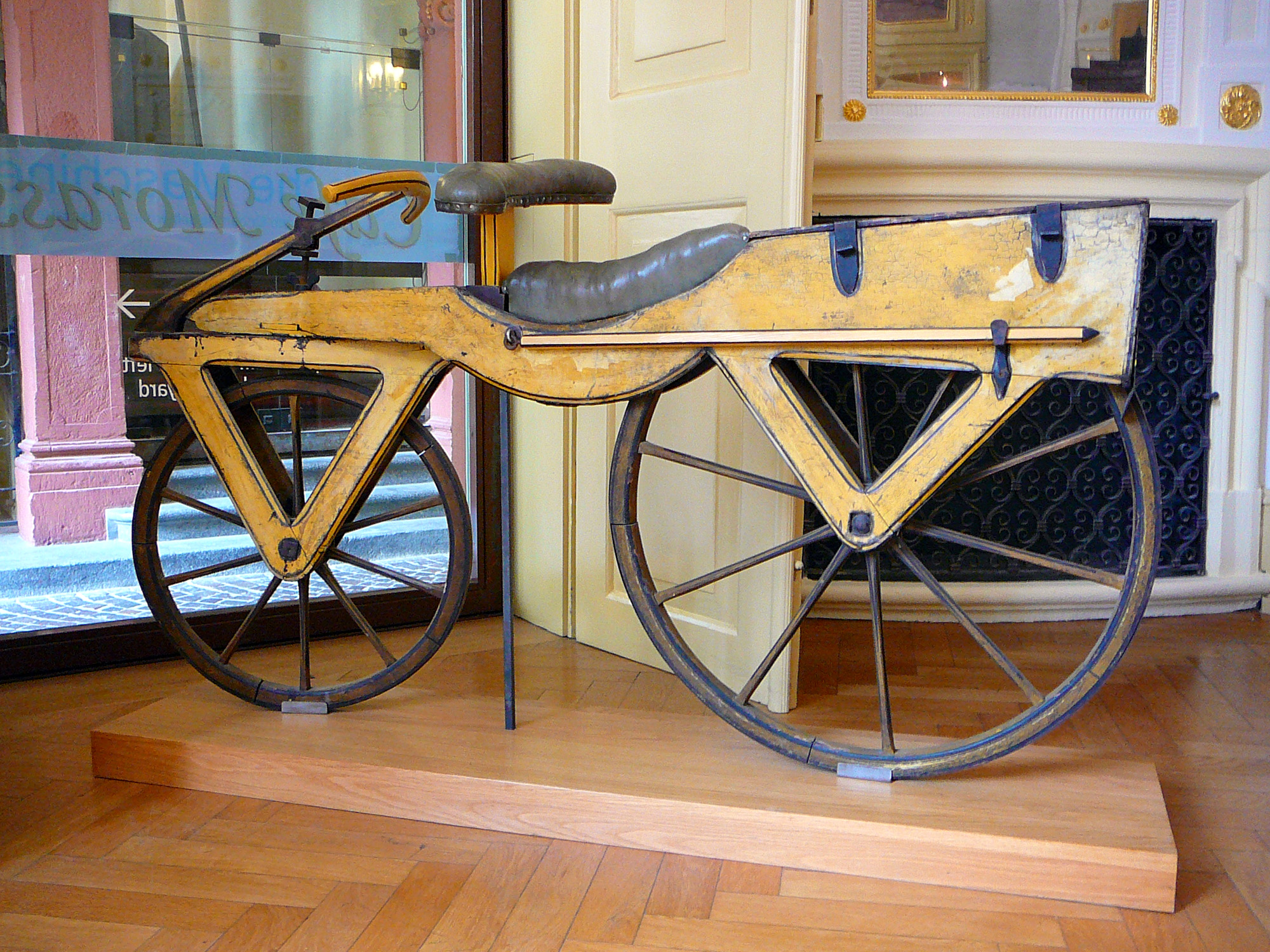
A wooden dandy horse from around 1820, a patent-infringing copy of the first two-wheeler

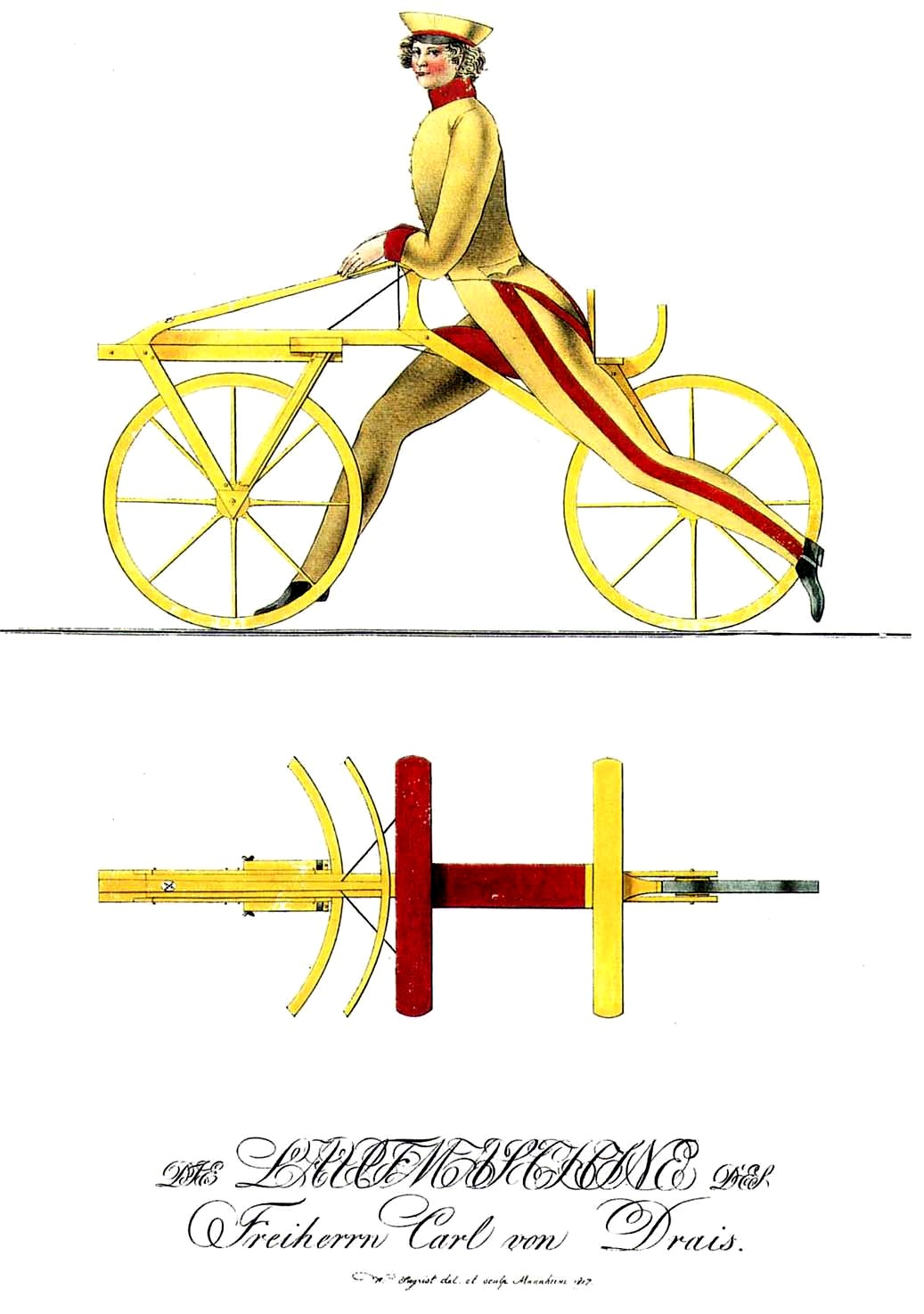
Original Laufmaschine of 1817 made to measure

The dandy horse, an English nickname for what was first called a Laufmaschine ('running machine' in German), then a vélocipède or draisienne (in French and then English), and then a pedestrian curricle or hobby-horse, or swiftwalker, is a human-powered vehicle that, as the first two-wheeled vehicle, is regarded as the first bicycle. The dandy horse is powered by the rider's feet on the ground instead of the pedals of later bicycles.

It was invented by Karl Drais, who called it a Laufmaschine German: [ˈlaʊfmaˌʃiːnə] 'running machine' in 1817, and patented by him in France in February 1818 as a vélocipède. It is also known as a Draisine (German: [dʁaɪˈziːnə] in German, a term used in English only for light auxiliary railcars regardless of their form of propulsion), and as a draisienne (French: [drɛzjɛn] in French and English. In English, it is sometimes still known as a velocipede, but that term now also has a broader meaning.

== History ==
The dandy-horse was a two-wheeled vehicle, with both wheels in line, propelled by the rider pushing along the ground with the feet as in regular walking or running. The front wheel and handlebar assembly was hinged to allow steering. The dandy horse was capable of more than doubling the average walking speed, to around 10 mph (16 km/h) on level ground.

Drais was inspired, at least in part, by the need to develop a form of transit that did not rely on the horse. After the 1815 eruption of Mount Tambora and the Year Without a Summer (1816), which followed close on the devastation of the Napoleonic Wars, widespread crop failures and food shortages resulted in the deaths of tens of thousands of horses, which either starved to death or were killed to provide meat and hides. "In wartime," he wrote, "when horses and their fodder often become scarce, a small fleet of such wagons at each corps could be important, especially for dispatches over short distances and for carrying the wounded.”

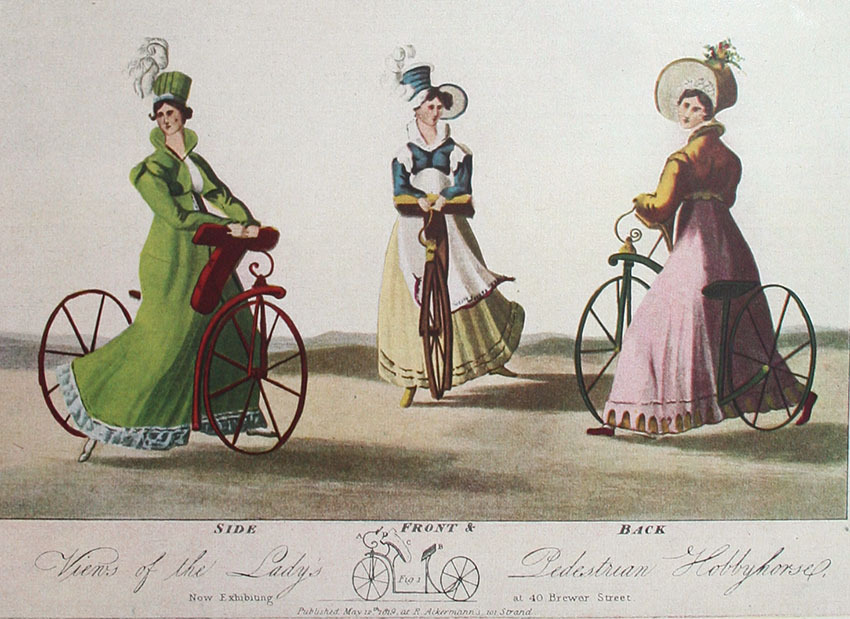
Johnson's Ladies' Walking Machine, sold in London 1818–1819

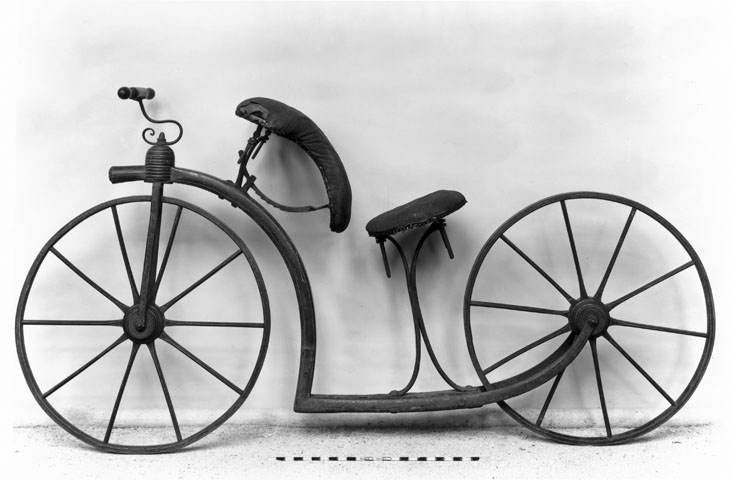
The remaining extant Johnson's Ladies' Walking Machine, in the Science Museum, London

Several manufacturers in France and England made their own dandy-horses during its brief popularity in the summer of 1819—most notably Denis Johnson of London, who used an elegantly curved wooden frame that allowed the use of larger wheels. In the United States, a patent for a two-wheeled human-powered vehicle was awarded to W.K. Clarkson of New York on June 26, 1819. In 1836, a fire in the U.S. Patent Office destroyed the only surviving drawings, and a prototype of the invention was never built by Clarkson.

Dandy horses first appeared on the footpaths of Mannheim, Germany, in 1820. They were heavy and cumbersome, and as a result, riders preferred to operate their vehicles on the smooth pavements instead of the rough roads. Their interactions with pedestrians caused many municipalities worldwide to enact laws prohibiting their use, and in New York City, a law was passed that banned dandy horses from all footpaths and public places. Later designs avoided the initial drawback of this device when it had to be made to measure, manufactured to conform with the height and the stride of its rider. An example is Nicéphore Niépce's 1818 model with an adjustable saddle for his 'velocipede' built by Lagrange.

In the 1860s in France, the vélocipède bicycle was created by attaching rotary cranks and pedals to the front-wheel hub of a dandy-horse.

=== Modern adaptation ===
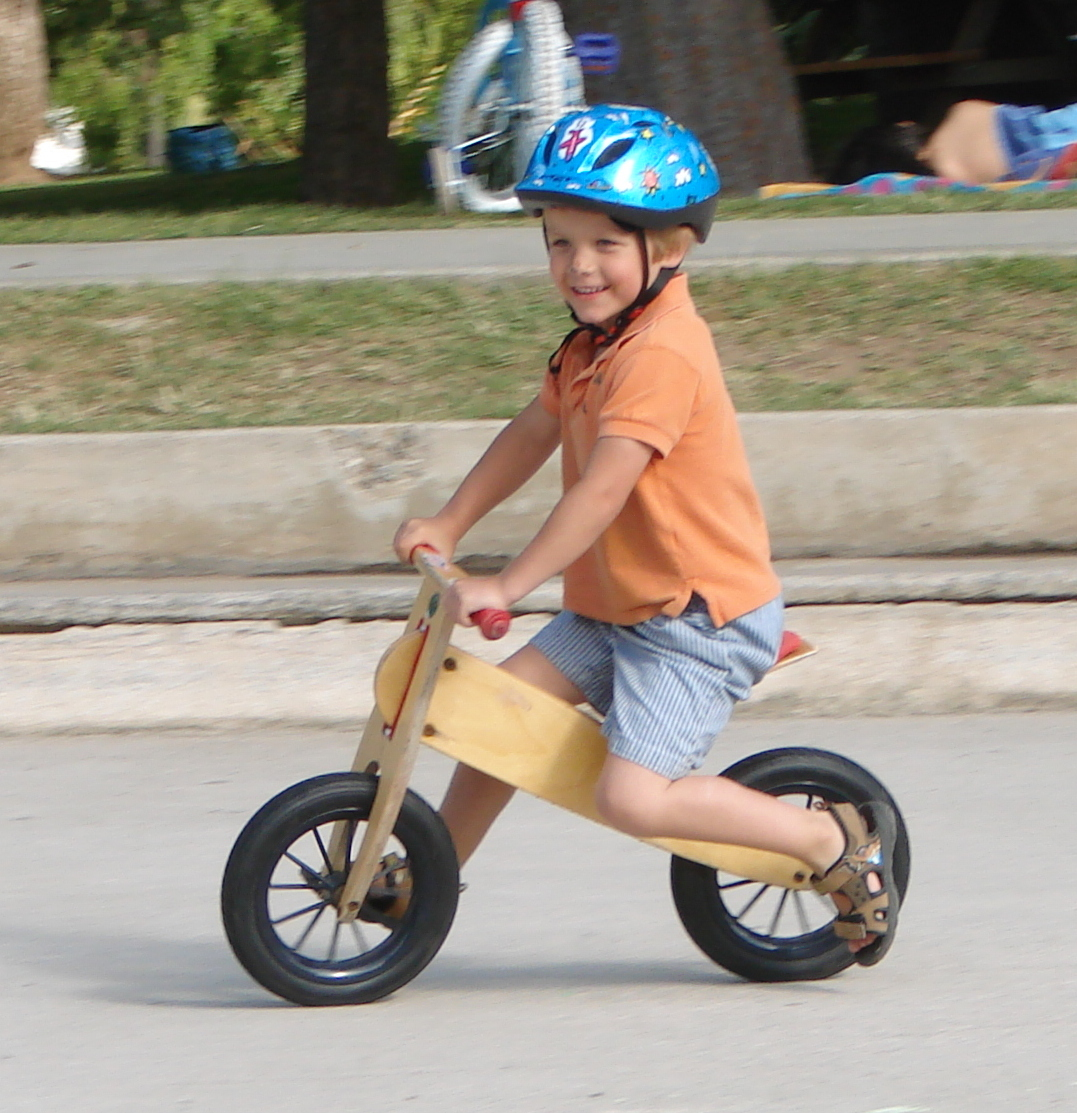
The modern balance bike borrows from the dandy horse.

The dandy horse has been adapted as a starter bicycle for children, and is called a balance bike, or a run bike.

== See also ==
- Balance bike
- Outline of cycling
- Penny-farthing
- Velocipede

== Literature ==
- H.E.Lessing: How sophisticated was the draisine? The Boneshaker #159 (2002)
- T.Hadland and H.E.Lessing: Bicycle Design - An Illustrated History, MIT Press, Cambridge; MA 2014
- C.Reynaud: L'Ère de la Draisienne en France 1818-1870, Éditions Musée Vélo-Moto, Domazan 2015
