= Le Vélocipède Illustré =

19th century newspaper in France

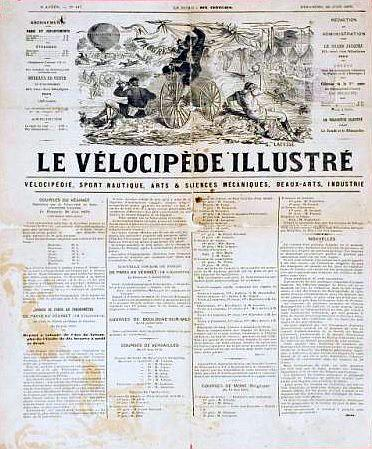
- The edition of Le Vélocipède illustré from 26 June 1870.
- Type: Fortnightly cycling journal
- Editor: Richard Lesclide (1869–1872)
- Founded: 1869–1872
- Website: www.Antediluvian.fr

Le Vélocipède Illustré (Bicycle Illustrated) was a fortnightly (twice monthly) illustrated French newspaper which covered cycling, water sports, mechanical arts and sciences, fine arts, and industry. First published in Paris on the 1 April 1869 by Richard Lesclide, it continued publication until 1872.

As part of its promotional marketing Le Vélocipède Illustré co-organised the world's first 'city to city' road-race for bicycles, from Paris to Rouen on 7 November 1869.

== The founder ==
Le Vélocipède Illustré was published on 1 April 1869 by Richard Lesclide, alias Le Grand Jacques, a pioneer of sports journalism. Lesclide eventually became the secretary of Victor Hugo.

Lesclide was described by Edward Seidler in his book The Media and Sport (Presse et Sport) as:

"A man predestined to write the first pages of the legend of cycling."

== The first edition ==
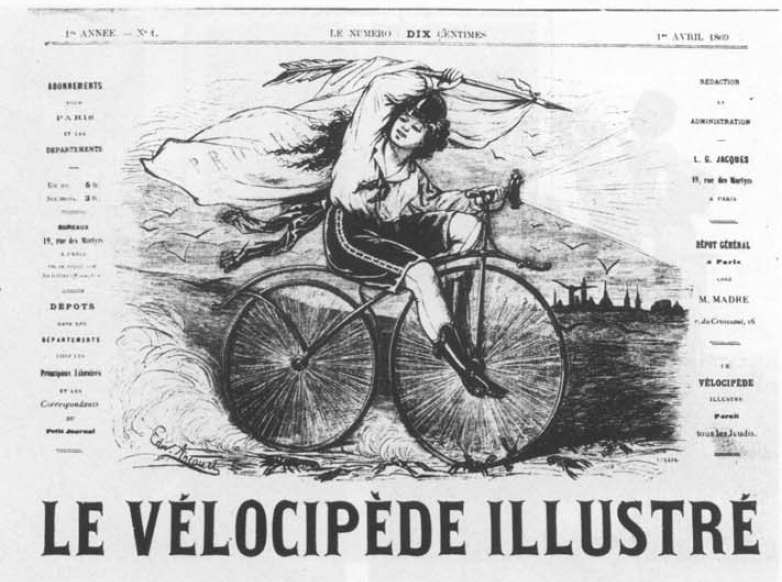
Masthead of the first edition of Le Vélocipède illustré from 1 April 1869, introducing the voluptuous Lady Progress astride a 'boneshaker'

A bicycle boom occurred in France during the 1860s. In October 1868 Le Vélocipède was published in Foix, Ariège, although the title was misleading as it was not related to velocipedes, but an excuse to obtain an Imperial publication license. On 1 March 1869 another independent newspaper called Le Vélocipède was published in Voiron, near Grenoble. It promoted itself as the "Humorous journal and gazette of sportsmen and cyclists (vélocemen)." The publisher was monsieur A Favre, a manufacturer of bicycles and tricycles. This version only survived for 3 months.

On 1 April 1869, the first edition of Le Vélocipède Illustré appeared at the peak of the bicycle boom. The masthead featured an image of the voluptuous Lady Progress astride a boneshaker, and the main banner stated its coverage as:

Vélocipédie (cycling), Sport Nautique (Water sports), Arts and Sciences Mécaniques (Mechanical Arts and Sciences). Beaux-Arts (Fine Arts), Industrie (Industry).

Subsequent editions featured a range of images of Lady Progress surrounded by contemporary cycling fantasy scenes, such as the montage (illustrated) of ballooning, walking, travel, outdoor life and freedom.

In the manifesto of the first edition, Richard Lesclide, the editor, stated:

"The velocipede is not a fad born yesterday, in vogue today, to be forgotten tomorrow. Along. with its seductive qualities, it has an undeniably practical character. It supplants the raw and unintelligent speed of the masses with the speed of the individual. This horse of wood and iron fills a void in modern life; it responds not only to our needs but also to our aspirations."

The novelty of the new publication about cycling attracted the attention of the New York Times, which carried a report from the 'Velocipede correspondent of the London Star':

The art of velocipede driving has attained such importance in France that it has its organ, in the form of a remarkably well written illustrated paper, entitled the Vélocipède Illustré. In this assuming little journal your velocipedists will find every possible light thrown on their art, and minute records of the last feats performed by their Gallic rivals. (The New York Times, August 2, 1869).

== Paris–Rouen ==
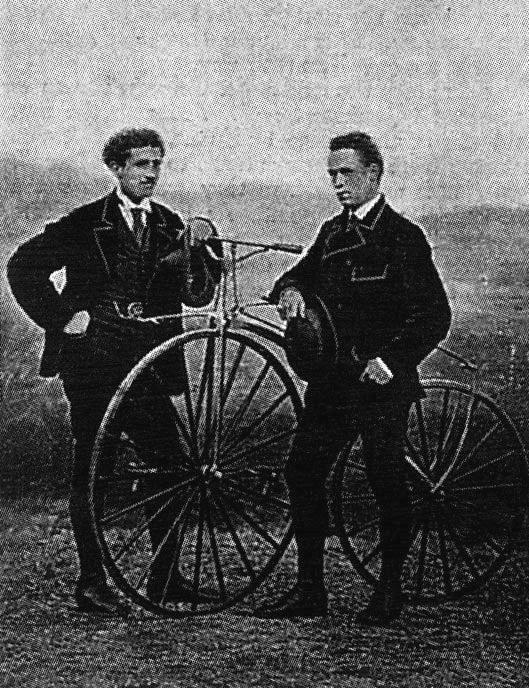
Paris–Rouen Winner James Moore (right) and Jean-Eugène-André Castera

Le Vélocipède Illustré organised the world's first 'city to city' (road-race) bicycle race, from Paris to Rouen on 7 November 1869. The event was sponsored by the Olivier brothers, owners of a bicycle manufacturer company called The Michaux Company. They had been delighted with the success of the world's first bicycle race, a day of short races held in Parc de Saint-Cloud, Paris and so promoted the 123 kilometre race between Paris and Rouen. The first prize was one thousand gold francs and a bicycle. and the rules said the riders were not 'to be pulled by a dog or use sails'.

The race started at the Arc de Triomphe in Paris and finished in the centre of Rouen. The course took them through St-Germain-en-Laye (16 km), Mantes (39 km), Vernon (63 km) and Louviers (97 km). 325 riders started the race and the winner was an Englishman living in Paris, James Moore, who took 10 hours and 40 minutes. He is presumed to have been riding a Suriray bicycle built by Tribout and possibly the first bike ever equipped with ball bearings, which were patented by Jules Suriray, a Parisian bicycle mechanic, in 1869. The bicycle, draped with the Union Jack, disappeared from outside a cafe in the rue Notre Dame des Victoires during the post-race celebrations.

== Demise ==
Le Vélocipède Illustré continued publication until 1872, when the impact of the Franco-Prussian War depressed sales at the end of the cycling boom.

=== Rebirth ===
It reappeared in 1890 under the aegis of its founder, Richard Lesclide, who was 67 years old, with his wife Juana as editor. She wrote under the 'nom de plume' Jean de Champeaux, and continued until her husband's death in 1892.

The next editor was Paul Faussier, a sports journalist and member of Company Vélocipédique Metropolitan (Metropolitan Vélocipéde Company). Under Faussier's leadership Le Vélocipède Illustré organized and publicised the first race of "horseless carriages" on 28 April 1887 between Neuilly and Versailles.

=== Redemise ===
It ceased publication about 1901.

== See also ==
- L'Auto
- Le Vélo
