= Welsh Harp =

Welsh Harp may refer to:

- Welsh triple harp or triple harp, a traditional musical instrument
- Welsh Harp (ward), an electoral ward of the Brent London Borough Council
- Welsh Harp railway station, London 1870–1903
- Brent Reservoir or Welsh Harp, London
