= Pierre Lallement =

Considered by some to be the inventor of the pedal bicycle

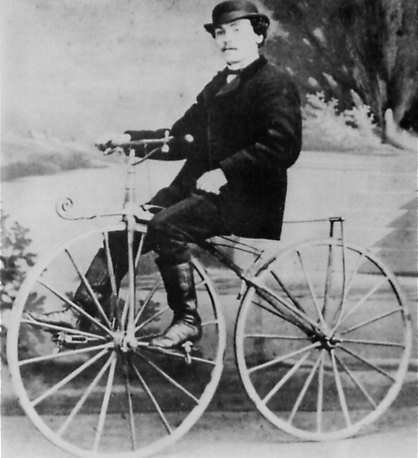
Pierre Lallemant riding his own invention in Paris in 1870.

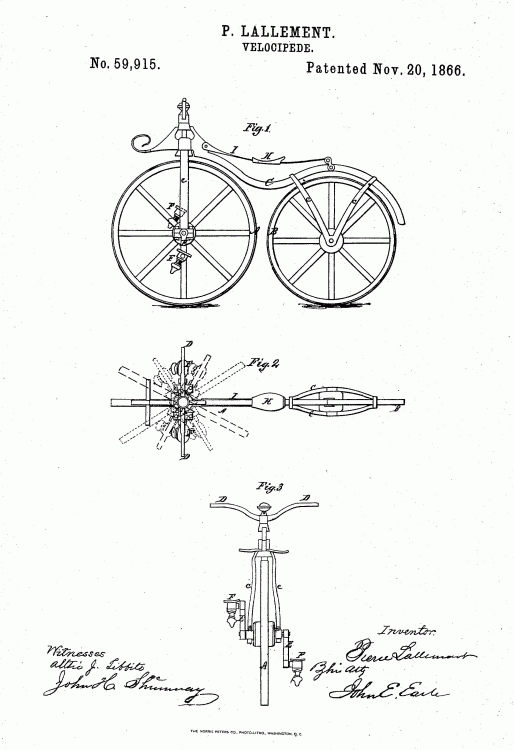
US Patent No. 59,915, filed by Pierre Lallement, granted on November 20, 1866.

Pierre Lallement (French: [lalmɑ̃]; October 25, 1843 – August 29, 1891) is considered by some to be the inventor of the pedal bicycle.

== Early years ==
Lallement was born on October 25, 1843, in Pont-à-Mousson near Nancy, France.

In 1862 while Lallement was employed building baby carriages in Nancy he saw someone riding a dandy horse, a forerunner of the bicycle that required the rider to propel the vehicle by walking. Lallement modified what he had seen by adding a transmission comprising a rotary crank mechanism and pedals attached to the front-wheel hub, thus creating the first true bicycle.

He moved to Paris in 1863 and apparently interacted with the Olivier brothers who saw commercial potential in his invention. The Oliviers formed a partnership with Pierre Michaux to mass-produce a 2-wheeled velocipede. Whether these bicycles used Lallement's design of 1864 or another by Ernest Michaux is a matter of dispute. Lallement himself may have been an employee of Michaux for a short time. The iron-wheeled invention was crude but popular, and the public dubbed it the "boneshaker."

Both the novelty of bicycles and their early precariousness is conveyed in the following excerpt from the book titled The Mechanical Horse by Margaret Guroff:

That fall, Lallement conducted a road test of about four and half miles, pedaling the velocipede mostly uphill to a nearby village of Birmingham (now part of Derby) and then doubling back home to Ansonia. As he told a journalist twenty years later, his delight during one bumpy downhill stretch turned to panic when he realized that his brakeless vehicle was about to rear-end a horse-drawn wagon. He yelled a warning to the two men in the wagon, then veered and tumbled into a roadside culvert filled with water, cracking his head in the process. The terrified men, meanwhile, whipped their horses into a run and took off. Lallement collected himself and rode to Ansonia’s main street, where, drenched and bleeding, he stopped in a tavern. "There he found the two men," the journalist worte, "relating between drinks how they had seen the dark Devil, with human head and body half like a snake, and half like a bird, just hovering above the ground which he seemed no way to touch, chase them down the hill." Lallement approached the men and, in his thick French accent, exclaimed, "I was the Devil!".

== American career ==
Lallement left France in July 1865 for the United States, settling in Ansonia, Connecticut, where he built and demonstrated an improved version of his bicycle. With James Carroll of New Haven as his financer, he filed the earliest and only American patent application for the pedal-bicycle in April 1866, and the patent was awarded on November 20, 1866. His patent drawing shows a machine bearing a great resemblance to the style of dandy-horse built by Denis Johnson of London, with its serpentine frame, the only differences being, first, the addition of the pedals and cranks, and, second, a thin strip of iron above the frame acting as a spring upon which he mounted the saddle to provide a more comfortable ride.

Failing to interest an American manufacturer in producing his machine, Lallement returned to Paris in 1868, just as the Michaux bicycles were creating the first bicycle craze in France, an enthusiasm which spread to the rest of Europe and to America. Lallement returned to America again sometime before 1880, when he testified in a patent infringement suit on behalf of plaintiff Albert Pope, to whom he had sold the rights in his patent. At the time Lallement was living in Brooklyn and working for the Pope Manufacturing Company. The Cycle reported he was working for Overman Wheel Company then Sterling Cycle Co. in 1886. He died in obscurity in 1891 in Boston at the age of 47.

== Later recognition ==
David V. Herlihy presented evidence at the fourth International Cycling History Conference in Boston, Massachusetts, Oct. 11–16, 1993, that Lallement deserves credit for putting pedals on the dandy horse.

A three-and-a-half-mile section of Boston's bike network that snakes through Southwest Corridor Park from Forest Hills to Back Bay is named the Pierre Lallement Bike Path. It passes not far from the house where Lallement died in 1891.

In 1998, a monument to Lallement was unveiled in New Haven as part of the city's International Festival of Arts & Ideas on New Haven Green at 990 Chapel Street.

Lallement was inducted into the United States Bicycling Hall of Fame in 2005.

== See also ==
- History of the bicycle

== Sources ==
- Charles E. Pratt, "Pierre Lallement and his Bicycle," in Outing and the Wheelman: An Illustrated Monthly Magazine of Recreation, vol. 3, October 1883 - March 1884 (Boston: The Wheelman Company, 1884), 4–13. Google Books: available online, accessed July 18, 2010
- Frederic D. Schwarz, "Behind the Wheels", in Invention and Technology Magazine (Winter 1994)
