= Arthur Markham =

Arthur Markham may refer to:

- Sir Arthur Markham, 1st Baronet (1866–1916), British industrialist and MP
- Arthur Markham (cyclist) (ca. 1860–1917), winner of the first formal cycle race held in Britain
