= Eugène Meyer (inventor) =

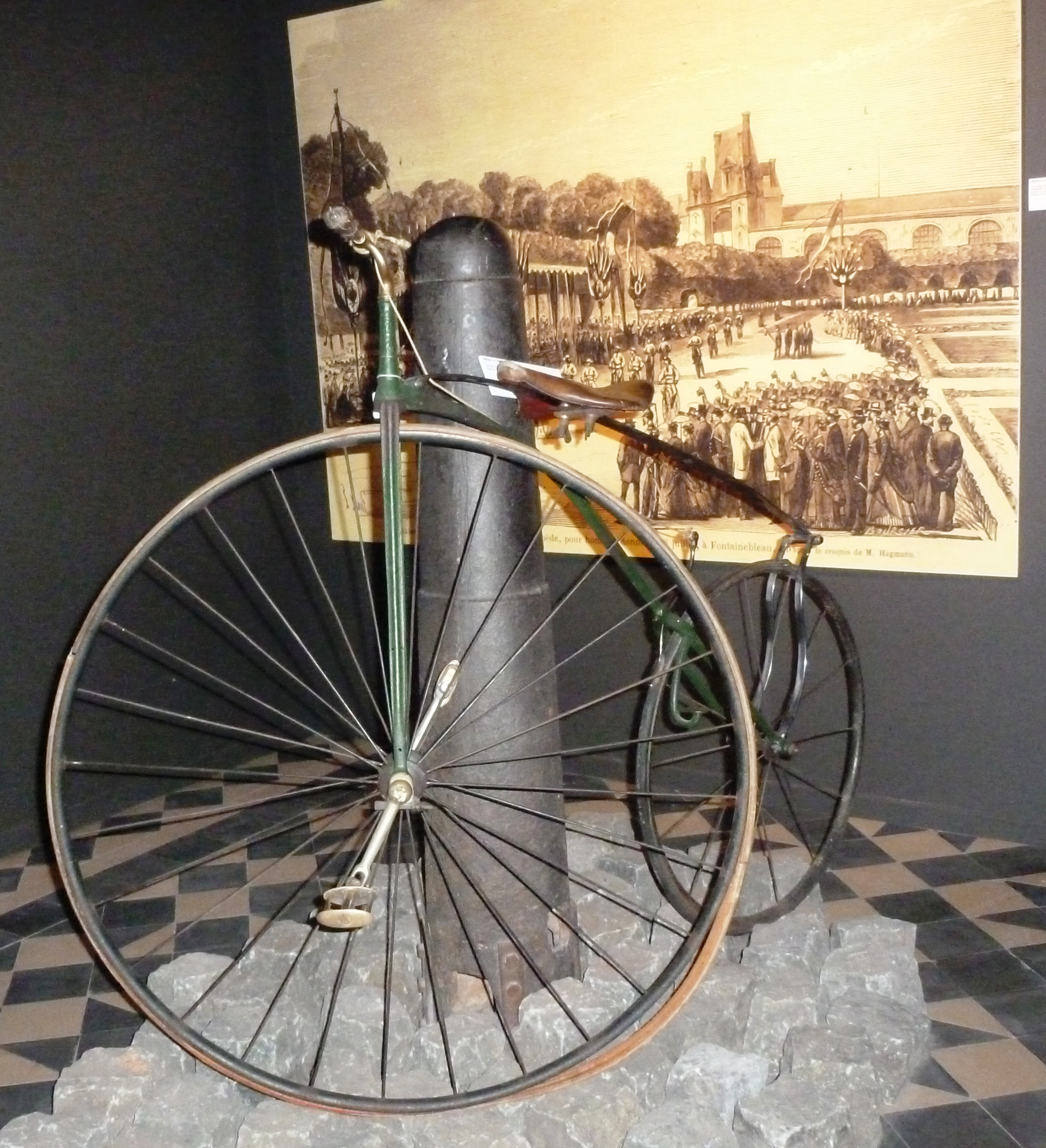
Eugène Meyer bicycle circa 1870 on display at the Wielermuseum in Roeselare, Belgium

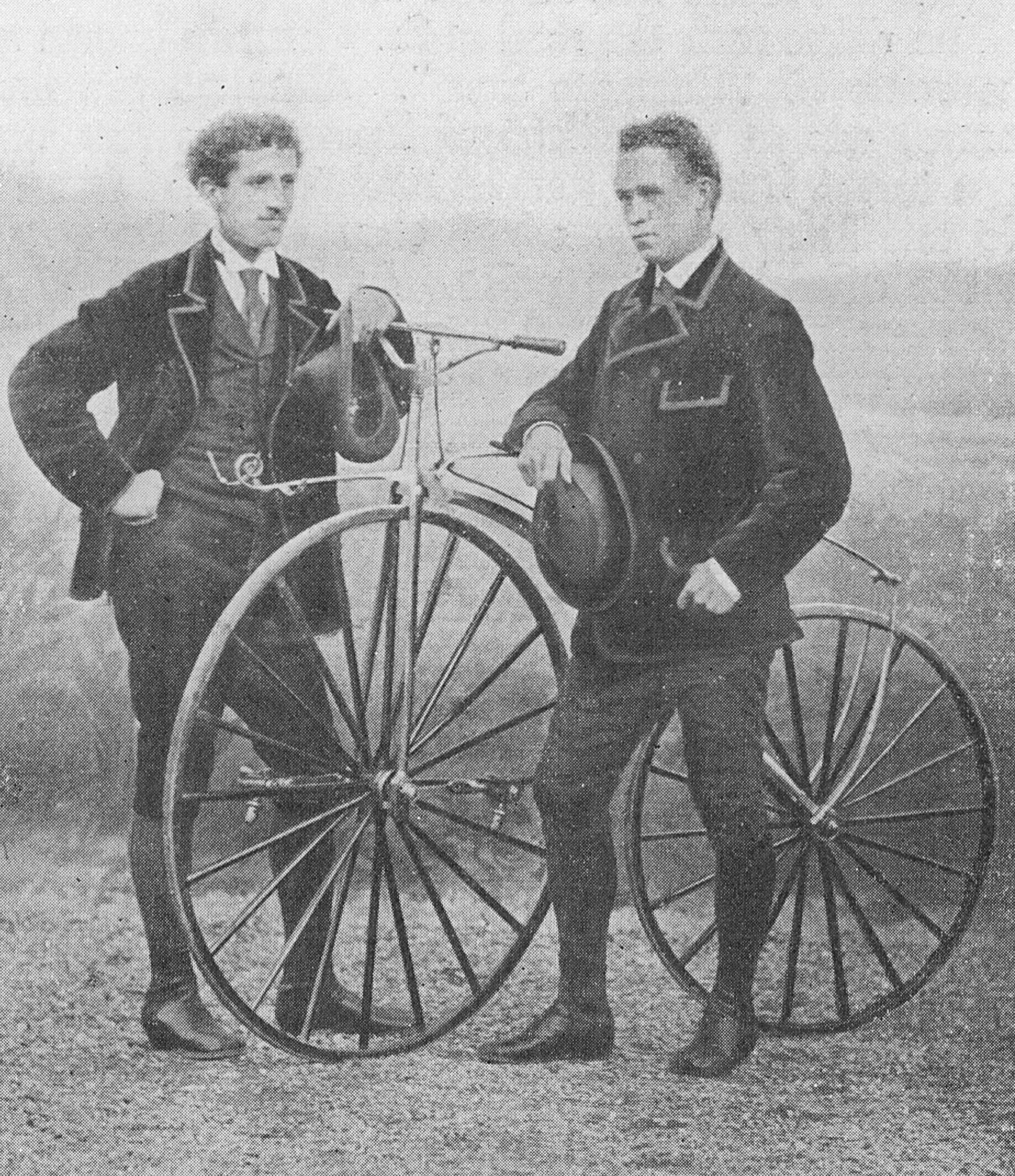
James Moore (right), winner of Paris–Rouen 1869 and Jean-Eugène-André Castera (left), runner up, posing with a Meyer bicycle

Eugène Meyer was a French mechanic credited with making important contributions to the development of the bicycle. In 1869 he received French patent no. 86705 for wire wheels and is now believed to be the person primarily responsible for making the penny-farthing feasible and widely known.

== Biography ==
Meyer was born in Alsace and lived in Paris. He raced his own bicycles in order to promote them and placed 10th in the 1869 Paris-Rouen race. James Moore rode a Meyer high wheeler at the Midland Counties Championship in Wolverhampton in August 1870, and thereby introduced the design to England. Meyer died in Brunoy en Essonne at the age of 63.
