= Paris–Rouen =

Paris–Rouen may refer to:

- Paris–Rouen (cycle race), completed for the first time in 1869.
- Paris–Rouen (motor race), completed in 1894.
- Paris–Rouen railway, later extended to become the Paris–Le Havre railway
