= Lallement =

Lallement may refer to:

- 5447 Lallement, a main-belt asteroid
- Pierre Lallement (1843–1891), French inventor
