= Jules Suriray =

French bicycle mechanic

Jules Pierre Suriray was a Parisian bicycle mechanic who patented, in 1869, the use of ball bearings in bicycles.

Suriray was awarded the patent on 2 August 1869. Bearings were then fitted to the winning bicycle ridden by James Moore in the world's first bicycle road race, Paris–Rouen, in November 1869. The bicycle is believed to have been built by Tribout.
