= Arthur Markham (cyclist) =

English racing cyclist

Personal information
- Full name: Arthur Matthew Markham
- Born: 1845 St. Marylebone, England, United Kingdom
- Died: 19 June 1917 (aged 71–72)

Cycling career
- Sport: Cycling
- Discipline: Road
- Role: Rider

Major wins
- Early cycle races Brent Reservoir a.k.a. Welsh Harp (1868) Bath (1868)

Arthur Matthew Markham (1845 – 19 June 1917) was an English cyclist who won the first formal cycle race held in Britain

== Biography ==
Markham won what is said to be the first formal cycle race held in Britain. It was in a meadow at Brent Reservoir, known locally as the Welsh Harp, in north-west London on Whitsun Monday, 1 June 1868. Markham received a silver cup from the licensee of the Old Welsh Harp Hotel, William Perkins Warner, who had sponsored the race. In another source, Warner is named as Jack.

Markham opened a bicycle shop at nearby 345 Edgware Road in 1872. He had another in Station Approach, Shepherd's Bush, London. Markham listed his occupation as an engineer in the 1881 census; his sister, Helen D. Markham was aged 23 and listed as a "bicycle maker".

The race was held the day after what is often referred to as the world's first race, in the park at Saint-Cloud west of Paris. It was won by another Englishman, James Moore. His grandson, John, believes Moore is buried near the reservoir.

Markham used his winnings to take a coach to Bath where on 27 June 1868 he took part in another race and beat a rider called Abrahams, considered the favourite. Markham was a strong swimmer and saved a man from drowning in the River Avon, although it is not clear if this was on the same trip. The Royal Humane Society awarded him a parchment in recognition of his bravery, on 21 October 1868.

In 1878 Markham was a co-defendant in a court case about fraudulent velocipede races. In his summing up of a complex and entertaining case, the Lord Chief Justice said:

...As to Markham, inasmuch as the plaintiff allowed the money for the stake to remain in the hands of Markham, after it had been arranged that the race, which originally was to have been an honest one, was converted into a dishonest one, ...there will be a verdict for the defendant Markham [i.e. innocent]. But looking on all parties as being mixed up in this fraudulent conspiracy I will exercise the power which I possess under the Judicature act, and, that although I direct that the judgement shall be entered for the defendant, it will be without costs."

Markham has also been described as a professional runner. His son, A. G. Markham, broke the Road Records Association unpaced tricycle record for 100 miles with 5h 57m 22s in 1903. He was captain of the Bath Road Club in west London.
