= Brent Reservoir =

Reservoir in North West London

Coordinates: 51.571°N 0.245°W

- Site of Special Scientific Interest
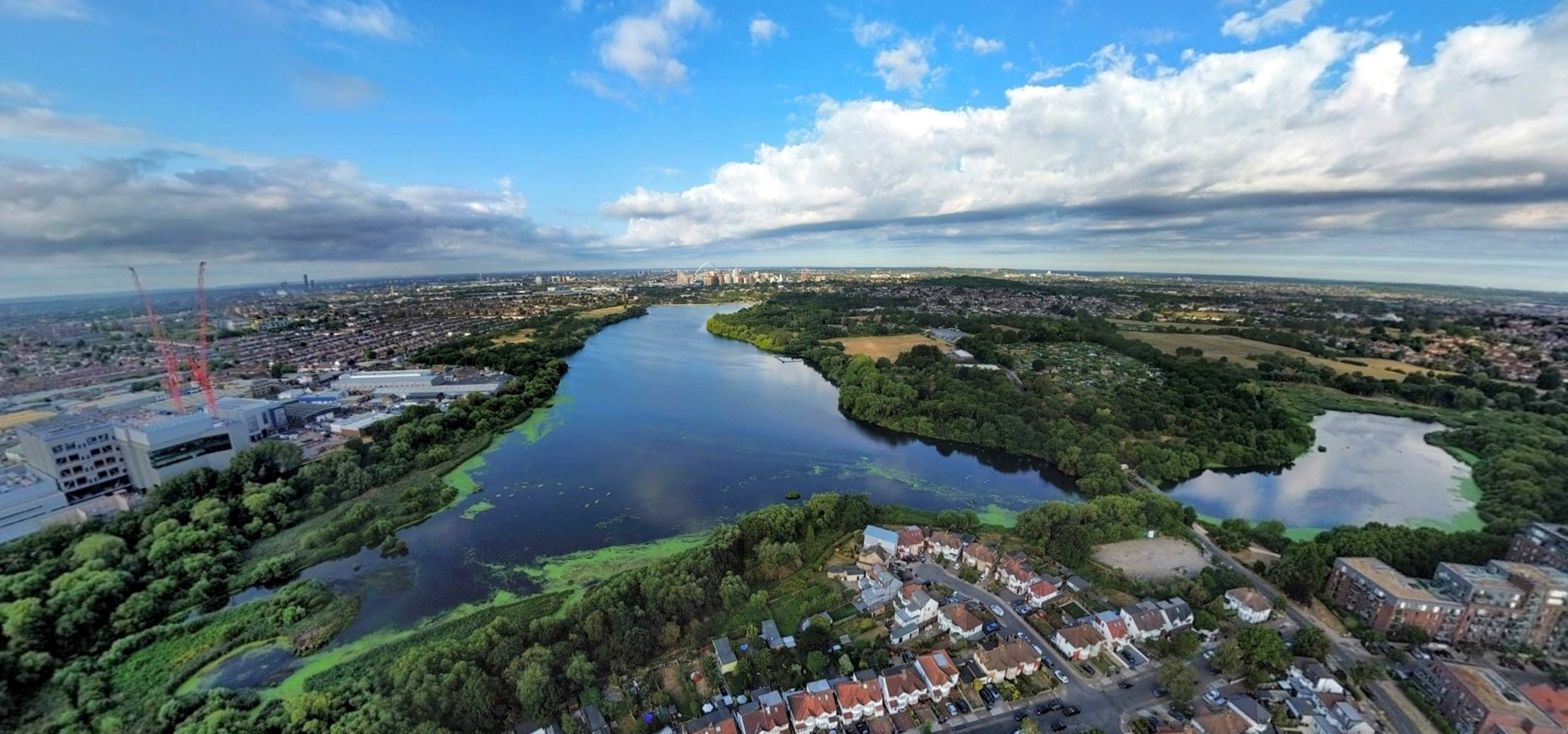
- Brent reservoir from the north east, looking towards the dam, with the buildings of Wembley in the distance.
- Location of Brent Reservoir.
- Area of search: Greater London
- Grid reference: TQ217873
- Interest: Biological
- Area: 68.6 hectares (170 acres)
- Notification date: 1985
- Location map: Magic Map

The Brent Reservoir (popularly called the Welsh Harp) is a reservoir in North West London. It straddles the boundary between the boroughs of Brent and Barnet and is owned by the Canal & River Trust. The reservoir takes its informal name from a public house called The Welsh Harp, which stood nearby until the early 1970s. It is a 68.6-hectare (170-acre) biological Site of Special Scientific Interest (SSSI), the only SSSI in either borough and one of 37 SSSIs in Greater London.

The reservoir is fed by the Silk Stream and the River Brent. Its main outflow is the River Brent. Its smaller outflow is a feeder channel to the canal system. It holds an estimated 1,600,000 m^{3} (57,000,000 cu ft). In 1994 when the reservoir was drained, more than 3,000 kg (6,700 lb) of fish were captured, 95% of which were roach. However, fishing is prohibited.

The reservoir has a sailing centre, home to Welsh Harp Sailing Club, Wembley Sailing Club, the Sea Cadets, and the University of London sailing club. In 1960, it also hosted the Women's European Rowing Championships. The reservoir also hosts the Phoenix canoe club and outdoor centre.

== Location ==
The reservoir is adjacent to the A406 North Circular Road (outside it) and the A5 Edgware Road, and a short distance to the north-east of Wembley Stadium. Residential areas around the reservoir include: Neasden, Kingsbury Green, West Hendon and Cricklewood.

== Construction ==
Plans for the construction laid in 1803 were abandoned because of cost. Canal branches and wharves continued to be dug in the early 19th century. Regular traffic meant lock openings draining the local canals (several feet above sea level) leading to canal-water shortages. By 1820 there was not enough water to supply the Grand Union Canal and the Regent's Canal so having obtained an enabling act of Parliament in 1819, the Regent's Canal Company decided to dam the River Brent to create a reservoir and cut a feeder channel from it to an upper point on the Grand Union Canal. It now holds an estimated 1,600,000 m^{3} (57,000,000 cu ft).

The reservoir was constructed by contractor William Hoof between 1834 and 1835. The water flooded much of Cockman's Farm, to supply the Regent's Canal at Paddington. Its owner gave it the name of its then parish: it was named Kingsbury Reservoir. At first it was 69 acres (28 ha) between Old Kingsbury Church and Edgware Road. Hoof, under the tender awarded for the work (including the construction of a bridge), was paid £2,740 6s 0d (equivalent to £308,000 in 2025).

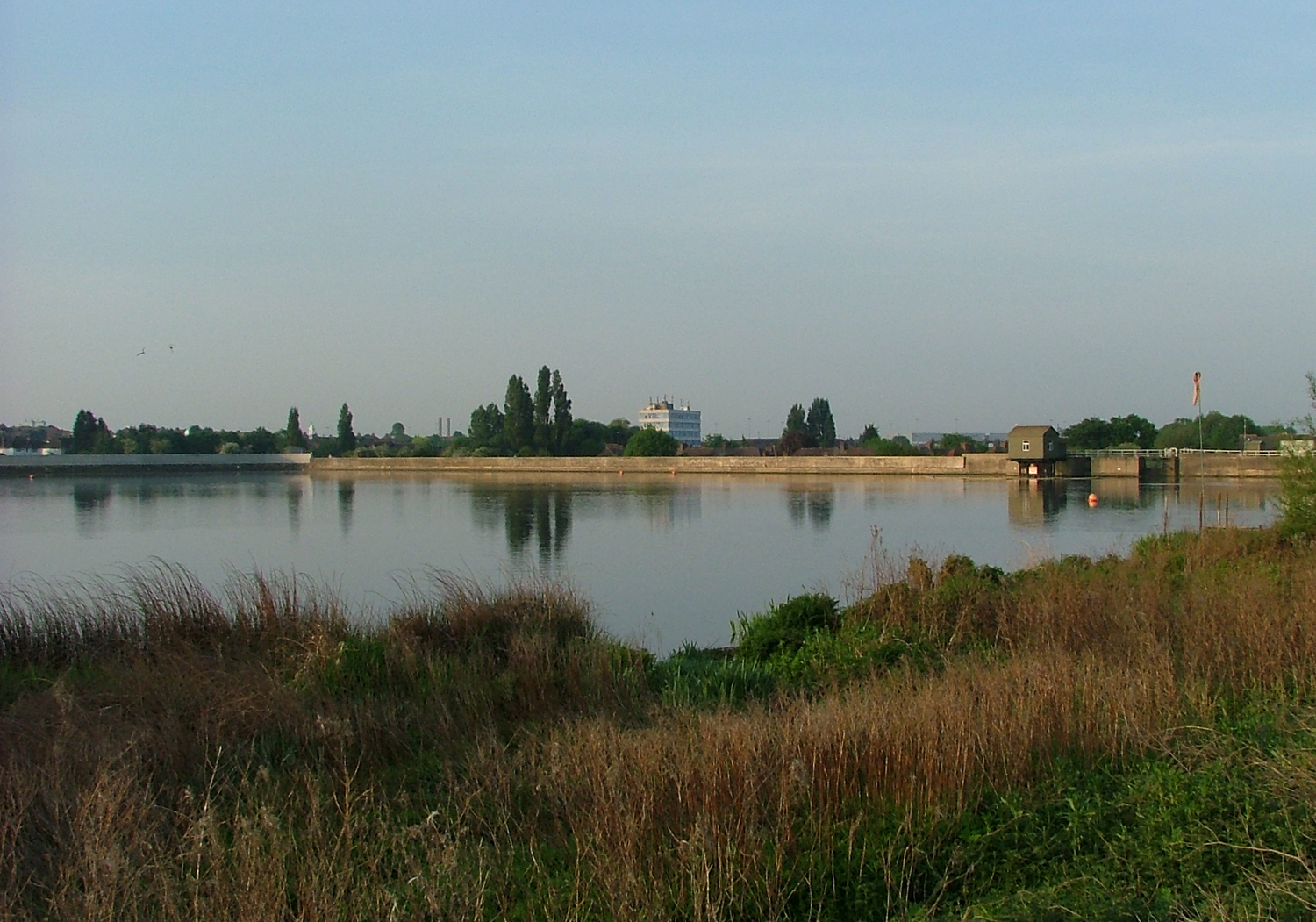
Brent Reservoir

Additional building was completed in December 1837 to extend the reservoir. In 1841 after seven days of continuous rain the dam head collapsed, killing two people. It was after this that a supervisor was employed for the first time, with a cottage near the dam, which remains.

At its greatest extent it covered 400 acres (160 ha) in 1853. It was reduced to 195 acres (79 ha) in the 1890s; later to 110 acres (45 ha).

In 1859 the famous Welsh Harp tavern was built on the site of an earlier coaching inn called the Harp or the Harp and Horn. The tavern was demolished in the 1970s, but the reservoir is still colloquially named after it.

== Sport and recreation ==
During the second half of the 19th century the area became a destination for recreation and evening entertainment, almost entirely due to W. P. Warner (1832–1899), who in 1858 became licensee of the Old Welsh Harp Tavern. The tavern stood on the Edgware Road, near where it crossed the Brent. Warner, who fought with distinction in the Crimean War, created the tavern along the lines of the London pleasure gardens (ironically at the same time when the most famous of all, the Vauxhall finally closed). For 40 years, Warner made the Old Welsh Harp Tavern one of London's most popular places and it was celebrated in song by the music hall star Annie Adams as 'The Jolliest Place That's Out'.

The amusements were focused not just on the inn, but around the reservoir. Warner operated a race track until an act of Parliament made it illegal. The first greyhound races with mechanical hares took place here in 1876. In 1891 Capazza attempted to launch his Patent Parachute Balloon – it failed to take off and accounts record 'nasty incidents' among the 5,000 spectators. These activities attracted a mixed clientele and crime and violence were not uncommon. One observer described the races as a 'carnival of vice'. The reservoir, like nearby Hampstead Heath, was also famous for Bank Holiday fairs. During its Victorian heyday a bear escaped from the menagerie.

=== Water sports ===
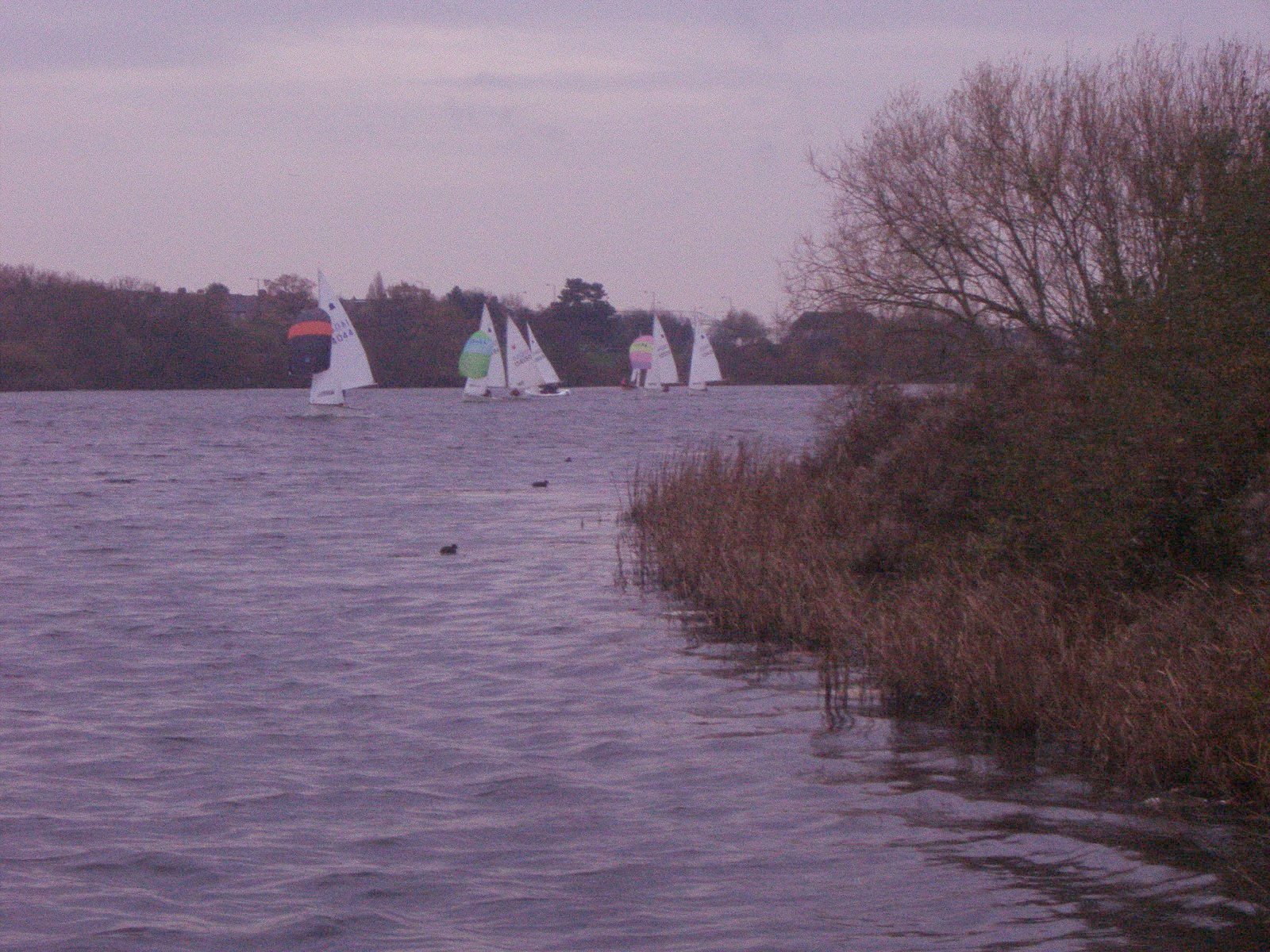
Sailing boats

The reservoir was popular for speed boat and other water sports, until its size became unsuitable. The reservoir has a sailing centre, which is home to the Welsh Harp Sailing Club, Wembley Sailing Club, the Sea Cadets, and the University of London Sailing club. It also hosted the 1960 European Rowing Championships, which that year was for women only as the men competed at the 1960 Summer Olympics instead. More than 200 competitors and officials attended, with 5,000 spectators. The BBC and Eurovision televised the event.

The reservoir also hosts the Phoenix Canoe Club and Outdoor centre. The Phoenix Club provides: Canoeing, Kayaking, Bell Boating, Raft Building, SUP (Stand-up Paddleboard), Sailing and powerboat to members.

=== Cycling ===
The first formal cycle race was held at the Welsh Harp grounds on 1 June 1868. It was won by Arthur Markham. He received a silver cup from the licensee of the Welsh Harp Hotel, the sponsor of the race. For many years Markham had a bicycle shop at nearby 345 Edgware Road.

The race was held the day after what is often referred to as the world's first race, in the park at St Cloud west of Paris. It was won by another Englishman, James Moore. His grandson, John, believes Moore is buried near the reservoir.

=== Ice sports ===
In past winters the reservoir froze for skating; national and international ice-skating events were held. In February 1893, Jack Selby drove a coach and four horses across the reservoir. Towards the end of the 19th century, urbanisation led to fewer informally organised frolics.

=== Miscellaneous ===
Naturists gathered at the Welsh Harp from 1921, until in June 1930 about 250 sunbathers were attacked by 200 objectors. This is referred to as "The Sun-Bathing Riots".

== Transport ==
The Midland Railway built its Welsh Harp station in 1870 on its new line from Bedford to St.Pancras. The area lost its attraction with the development of West Hendon between 1895 and 1915 and the station closed in 1903.

== War history ==
The Mechanical Warfare Department, part of the War Office based nearby in Cricklewood, used the Welsh Harp for secret tests of a new weapon from 1916: the tank, especially the amphibious Mark IX tank. Early film of these tests was shown on British television in the late 1990s. During the Second World War, a seaplane kept on the reservoir was rumoured to be an escape route for the prime minister. Local residents have recounted swimming to the plane. A DD Mk VII Tetrarch light tank was tested on the reservoir.

== Wildlife and nature conservation ==
During construction, the Welsh Harp attracted uncommon birds. James Edmund Harting and Frederick Bond were regular visitors and shot many birds. Harting documented these in his 1866 book the Birds of Middlesex. They included rare vagrants to the UK such as little bittern, squacco heron and white-rumped sandpiper. This started an interest in the birds of the Welsh Harp that continues until today, giving a unique historical perspective of a site in London. The next prominent ornithologist was William Glegg from the 1920s onwards and he wrote a paper for the London Naturalist in 1930 called The Birds of Middlesex since 1866, then a follow-up book to Harting's in 1935, called A History of the Birds of Middlesex.

After the Second World War, a new generation of ornithologists took an interest, such as Professor Warmington, and Eric Simms, who lived just south of the reservoir in Dollis Hill. They were joined by Dr Leo Batten in the late 1950s. He was one of the movers in setting up the Welsh Harp Conservation Group (WHCG) in 1972 to fight off development. The WHCG has worked to protect the area as a nature reserve, including preventing a golf course and driving range from being built.

The WHCG produces an annual report and in 2000 published a book, Birds of Brent Reservoir, which includes chapters on the social history, the effects of urbanisation and the habitats, as well as a study of the birds and other wildlife. The book's information on birds is regularly updated in an electronic publication, Birds of Brent Reservoir: Facts and Figures. All WHCG publication are available through its website. The WHCG also organises management work, which included an annual refurbishment of the tern rafts until the silting up of this part of the reservoir prevented a safe approach to the rafts, and the group works with Brent Council and Barnet Council on the management of the site, including applying for National Lottery funding.

The reservoir and much of its shoreline is a Site of Special Scientific Interest, mainly due to the diversity of breeding waterbirds. The reservoir and much of the surrounding area are a Local Nature Reserve and a Site of Metropolitan Importance for Nature Conservation.

=== Birds of the reservoir ===
The reservoir is an important site for breeding waterbirds such as great crested grebe, gadwall, shoveler, common pochard, tufted duck and common tern. At one stage, the reservoir was second only to Rutland Water for the most breeding pairs of great crested grebe in the UK. Other breeding birds include eight species of warbler. In 2008, the first nesting attempt by great cormorant took place as well as the first nesting attempt by grey heron for several years. Neither attempt was successful, but grey heron have bred successfully since 2017.

The reservoir has always enjoyed a reputation for rare birds. As well as those documented above, it attracted two black-winged stilts in 1918; the first great white egret in London in 1997; the blue-winged teal in 1996; the lesser scaup in 2003; and penduline tits in 1996 and 1997. Remarkably for an inland site, it also attracts rare vagrant warblers, notably the aquatic warbler in 1955, Hume's warbler in 2004 and yellow-browed warblers in several winters since 1994; however, most significant was an Iberian chiffchaff on 3 June 1972, the first recorded in the UK.

The current list of birds recorded at the reservoir numbers 253 species. The most recent species added to the list are Caspian gull (2015), ring-necked duck (2017) and cattle egret (2018).

=== Insects ===
Many other forms of wildlife have also been studied and were documented in the Birds of Brent Reservoir. There have been 31 species of butterfly at the reservoir, including breeding marbled white and ringlet, the closest site for these to the centre of London. The most recent addition was brown argus in 2015. Scarce species include a single dark green fritillary in 1999. Prior to the construction of the reservoir, marsh fritillary used to breed. Dragonflies and damselflies have been studied and 15 species have been seen, of which 12 breed at the reservoir.

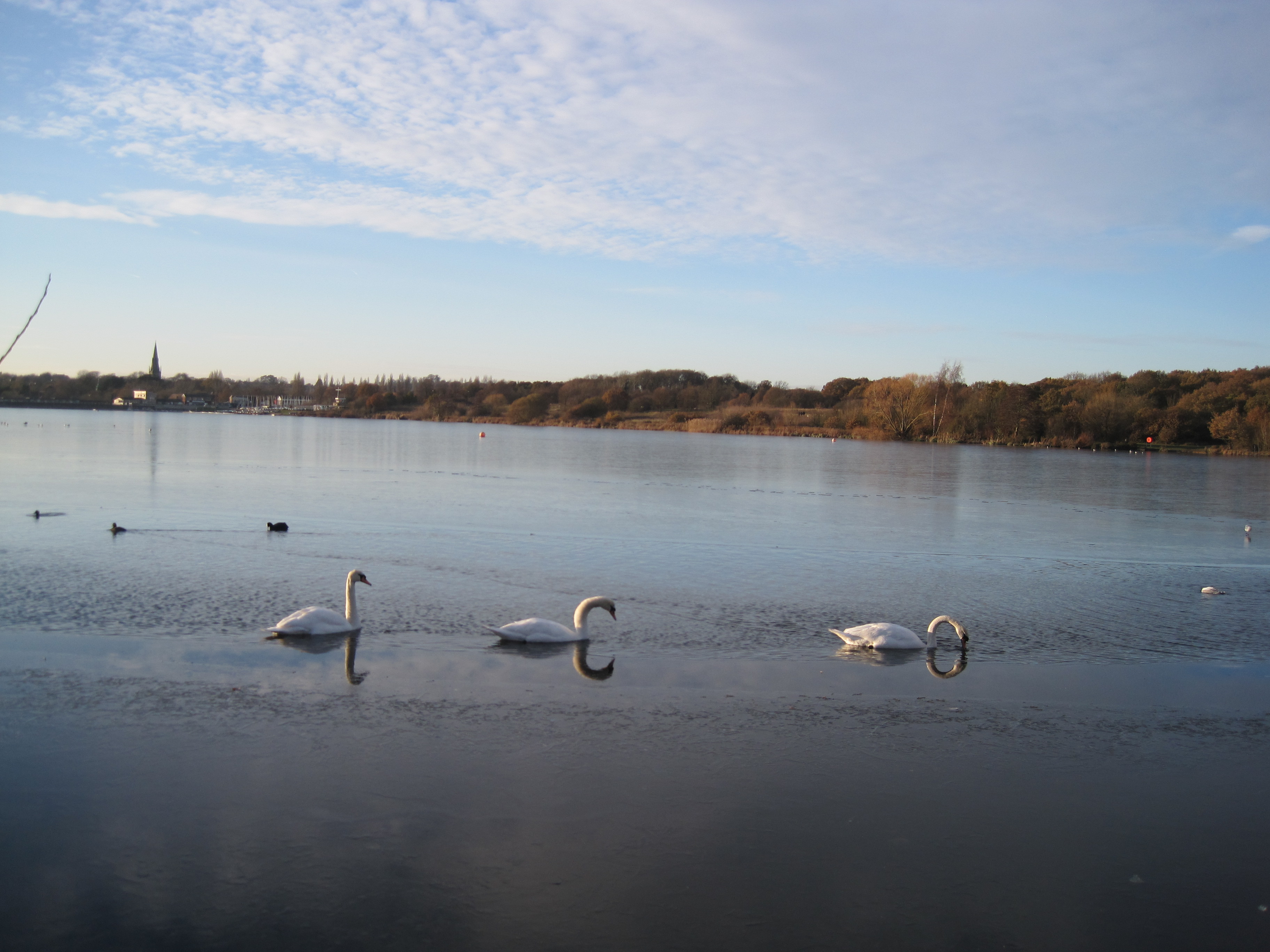
View from Neasden Recreation Ground of swans on Brent Reservoir

=== Mammals ===
The small list of the mammals is documented in The Birds of Brent Reservoir. The grey squirrel and the red fox are common; the latter mostly nocturnal. Muntjac have been present since the beginning of the 21st century but are shy, their presence noted mainly by tracks, one or two are occasionally seen in daytime. The reservoir is notable for bats: noctule, Leisler's bat, serotine, Daubenton's bat and three species of pipistrelle were recorded in one day in September 2007. Regular bat detection evenings in 2008 have shown that Nathusius' pipistrelle is present. Overall 22 species have been recorded, though some have not been recorded recently (e.g. stoats were last seen in the 1960s).

=== Other vertebrates ===
Four species of reptiles, five species of amphibians, and nine species of fish have been recorded at the reservoir.

=== Neasden Recreation Ground ===
Neasden Recreation Ground is a park of 4.5 hectares (11 acres) on the southern shore of the reservoir. It is mainly grassland with woods, a sports ground and a children's play area. There is access from Aboyne Road and from the North Circular Road, opposite Brook Road and close to Staples Corner.

=== Welsh Harp Open Space ===
Welsh Harp Open Space is a park and nature reserve of 9.43 hectares (23.3 acres) on the north-west shore. It was established as a recreational area in 1965, and received a Green Flag Award for 2010–11. There is access from Birchen Grove. In the late 19th century, this area was served by the Welsh Harp railway station.

== Gallery ==
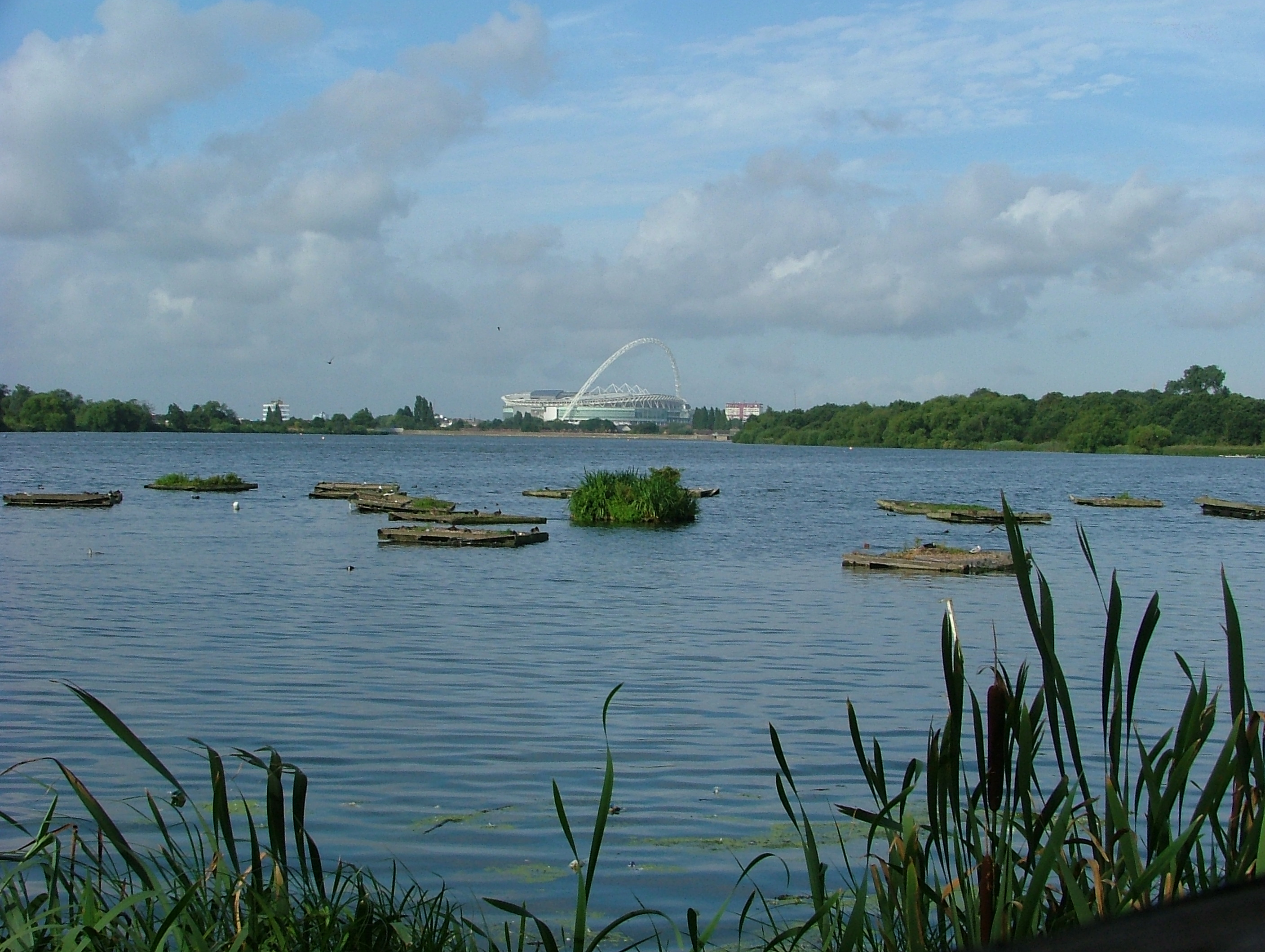
View from the hide towards the dam

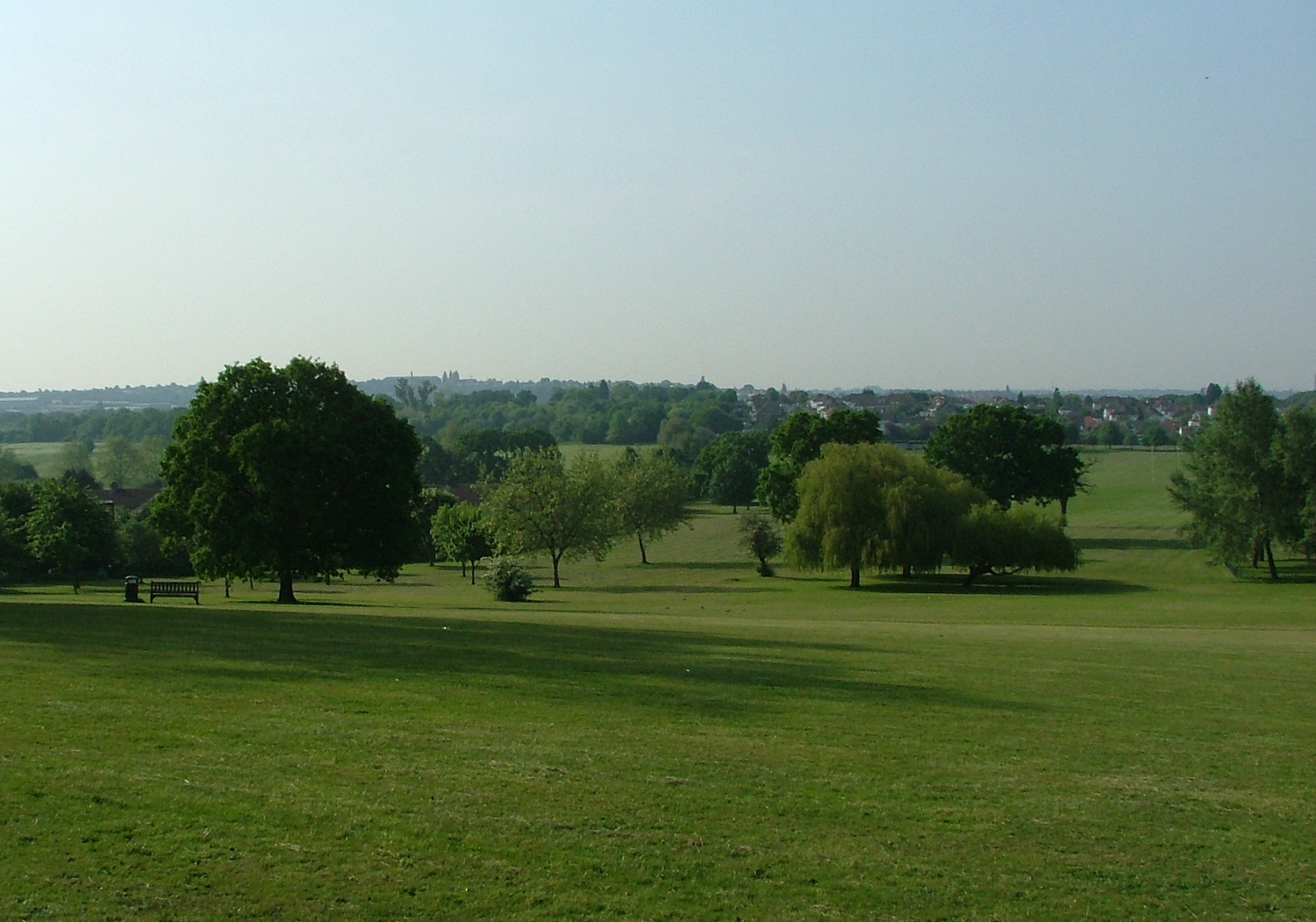
Silver Jubilee Park is part of the open space surrounding the reservoir

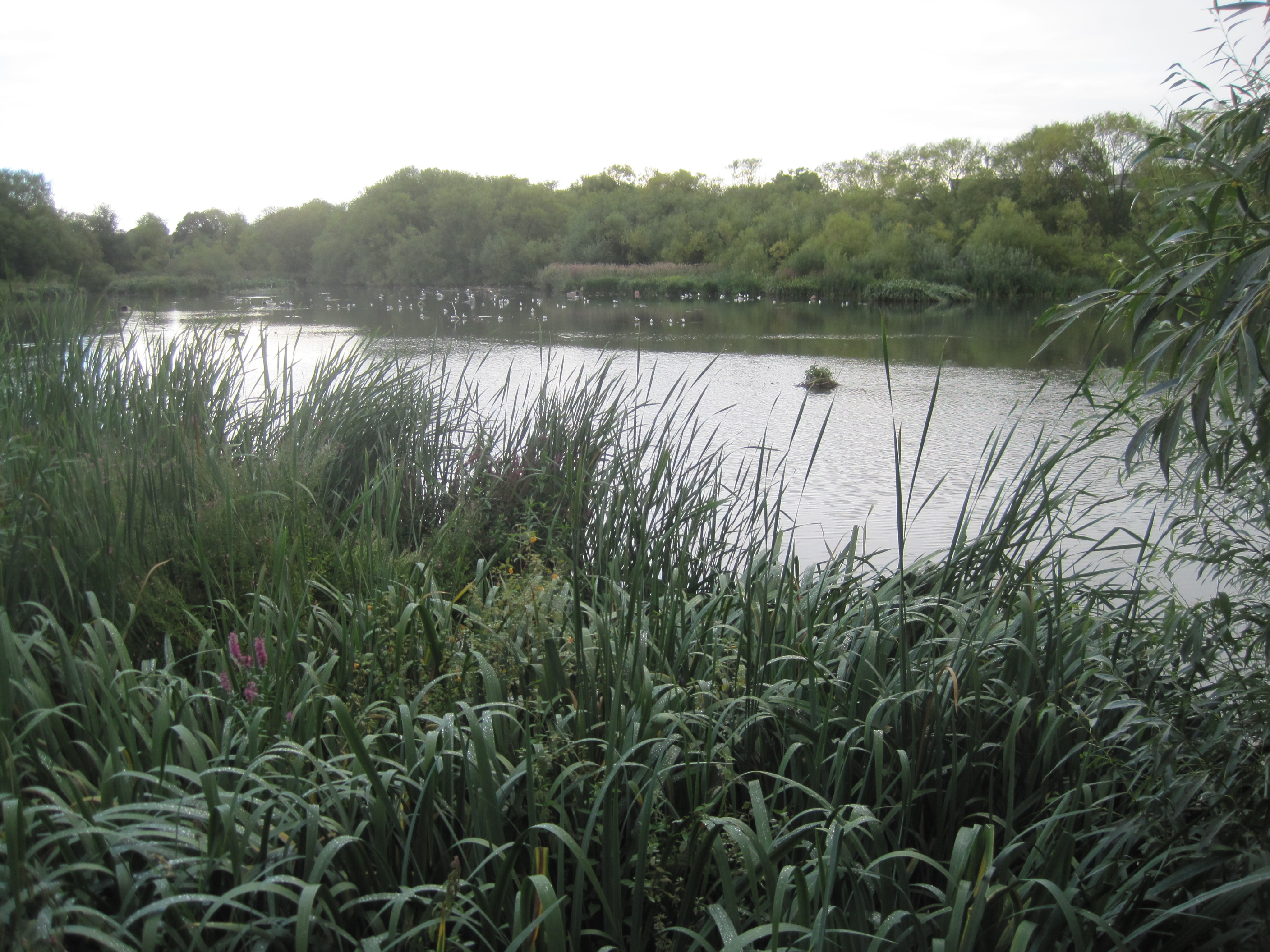
View of the northern arm of Brent Reservoir

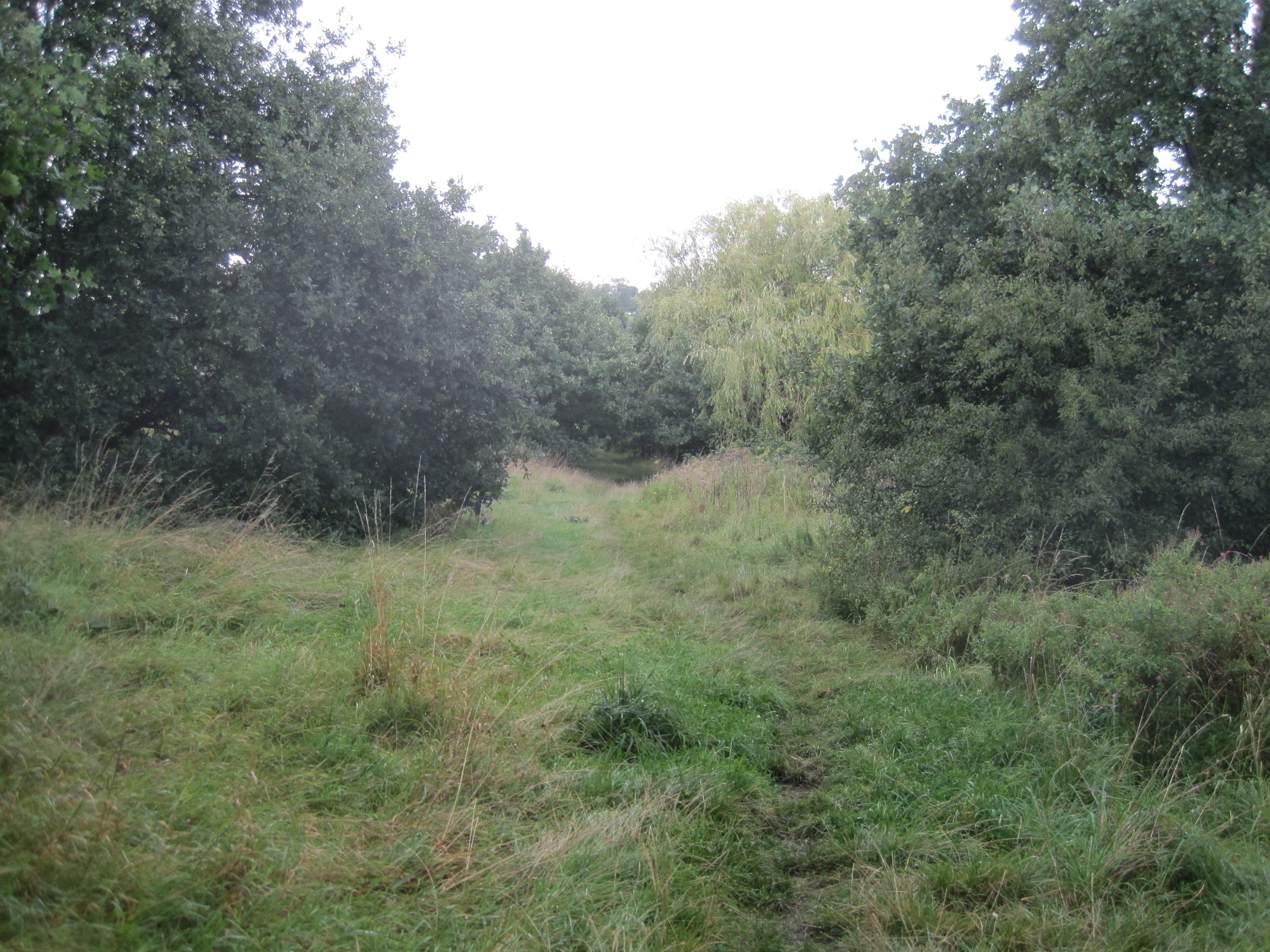
Brent Reservoir nature reserve north of Cool Oak Lane

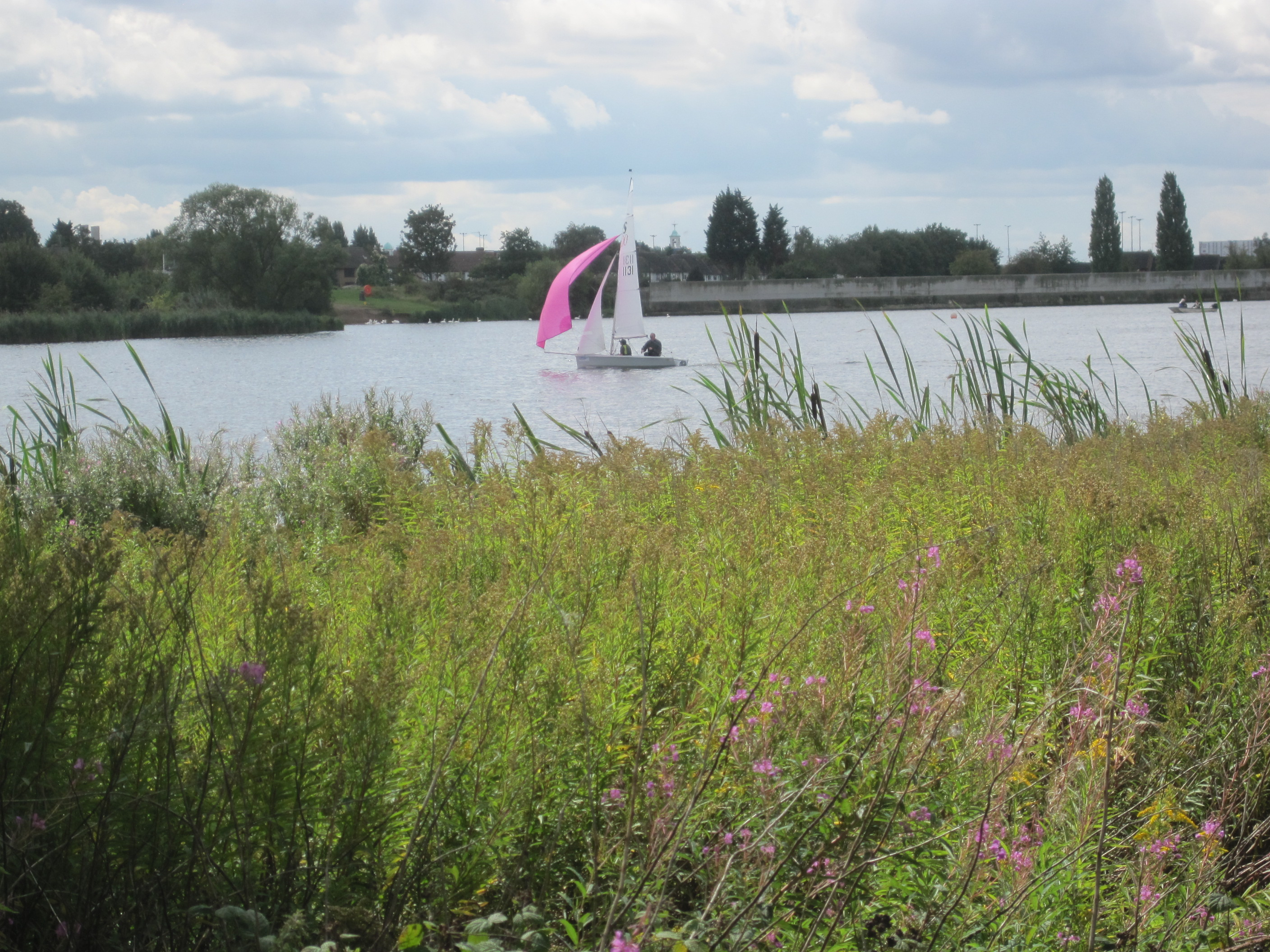
View of sailing boat on Brent Reservoir from Welsh Harp Open Space

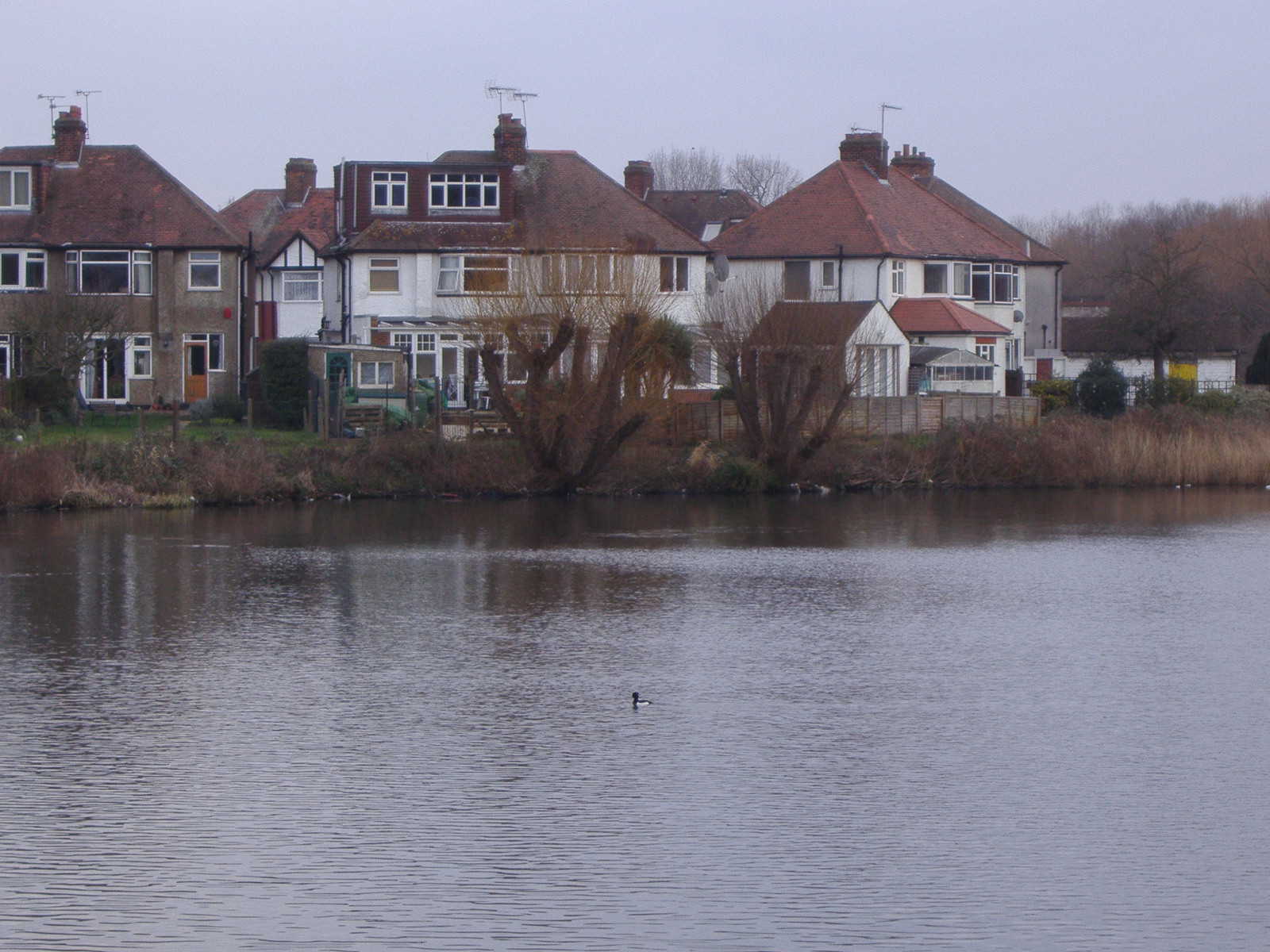
Houses by the Welsh Harp

== See also ==
- Barnet parks and open spaces
- Brent parks and open spaces
- Nature reserves in Barnet
- List of Sites of Special Scientific Interest in Greater London
- List of Local Nature Reserves in Greater London
