= Welsh Harp railway station =

Closed railway station in London

Welsh Harp
- Interactive map of Welsh Harp

General information
- Location: Hendon
- Local authority: London Borough of Barnet
- Owner: Midland Railway
- Number of platforms: 2

Key dates
- 1870: Opened
- 1903: Closed

Other information
- Coordinates: 51.5755°N 0.2356°W

Welsh Harp railway station was built by the Midland Railway in 1870 on its extension to St. Pancras station.

== History ==
The station opened on 2 May 1870. With a single island platform between the slow lines, it was important for people escaping from the City for a day out, fishing or boating on the Brent Reservoir built in 1838.

It was named after the nearby tavern, the Old Welsh Harp, but only lasted 33 years, closing on 1 July 1903. There are now no visible remains of the station as it was quickly demolished after closure. The Old Welsh Harp inn was demolished c. 1971.

== Route ==
Preceding station	Historical railways	Following station
Cricklewood; Line and station open	Midland Railway; Midland Main Line	Hendon; Line and station open
