= Pierre Michaux =

French blacksmith

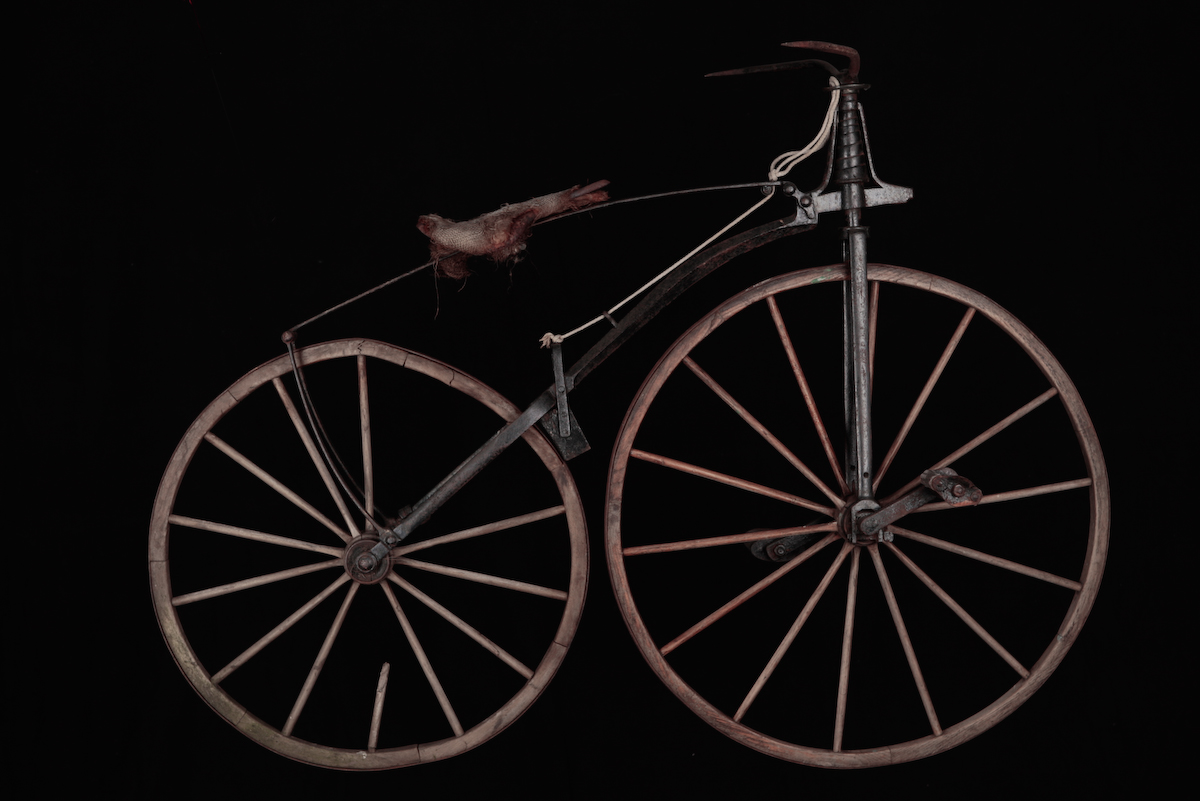
The Michaux velocipede had a straight fork and a spoon brake.

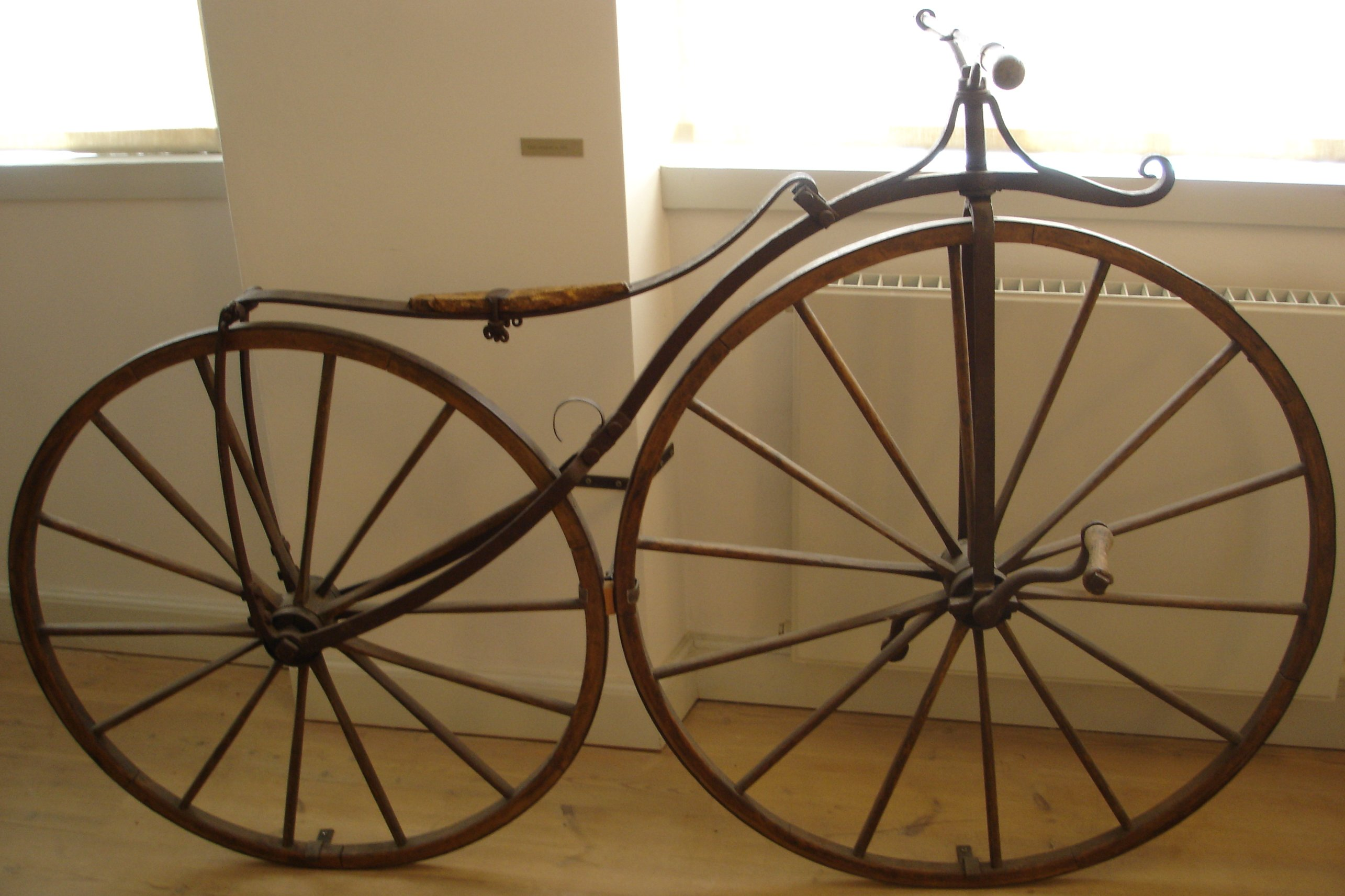
Serpentine frame

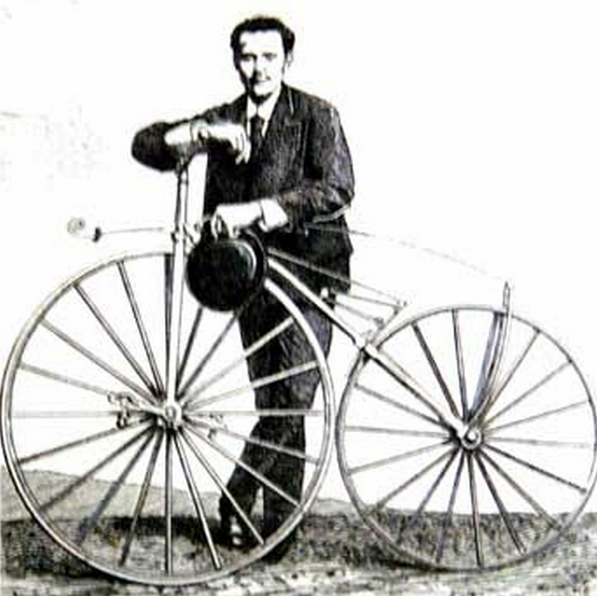
Ernest Michaux and Michaudine velocipede

Pierre Michaux (June 25, 1813 – January 10, 1883) was a blacksmith who furnished parts for the carriage trade in Paris during the 1850s and 1860s. He may have become the inventor of the bicycle when he added pedals to a draisine to form the Michaudine velocipede, the forerunner of the modern bicycle. However, historic sources reveal other possible claimants, such as his son Ernest Michaux and Pierre Lallement.

== History ==
Pierre Michaux was born at Bar le Duc and worked as a blacksmith who furnished parts for the carriage trade in Paris during the 1850s and 1860s.

He started building bicycles with pedals in the early 1860s. He, or his son Ernest, may have been the inventor of this machine, by adapting cranks and pedals on the front wheel of a draisine. In 1868, he formed a partnership with the Olivier brothers under his own name, Michaux et Cie ("Michaux and company"), which was the first company to mass-produce pedal-powered velocipedes, known as the Michaudine.

The design was based on the previous model, the only difference being that on the bicycles of the new company the serpentine frame was made of two pieces of cast iron bolted together, instead of wood, which made it more elegant and enabled mass-production. The wheels were made of wood and the tires made of iron, like those on horse-drawn carriages.

In 1865, a blacksmith from Lyon named Gabert designed a variation on the frame which was of a single diagonal piece of wrought iron and was much stronger—by that time Pierre Lallement had emigrated to America, where he filed the only patent for the pedal bicycle.

It soon became evident that the serpentine 45 kg cast-iron frames were not sturdy enough, and with competing manufacturers already producing bicycles with the diagonal frame, the Oliviers insisted that Michaux follow suit. The partnership was dissolved in 1869, and Michaux and his company faded into oblivion as the first bicycle craze came to an end in France and the USA. Only in England did the bicycle remain popular, and England was the site of all of the next major improvements to the machine.

Michaux is often given credit for the idea of attaching pedals to the draisine, and thus for the invention of the bicycle—however, bicycle historians have stated it could have been the concept of his son Ernest, or Pierre Lallement, a carriage builder from Nancy who worked with the Olivier brothers.

Michaux died in France.

== See also ==
- Michaux-Perreaux steam velocipede
