= Bike boom =

Historic periods marked by increased bicycle enthusiasm, popularity, and sales

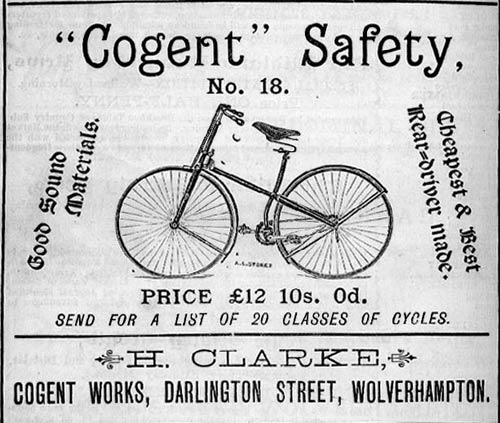
An advertisement for a safety bicycle that was to cause the great boom of the 1890s, costing £12 10s (equivalent to £1,400 in 2025).

The bike boom or bicycle craze is any of several specific historic periods marked by increased bicycle enthusiasm, popularity, and sales.

Prominent examples include 1819 and 1868, as well as the decades of the 1890s and 1970s – the latter especially in North America – and the 2010s in the United Kingdom.

== 1819 ==
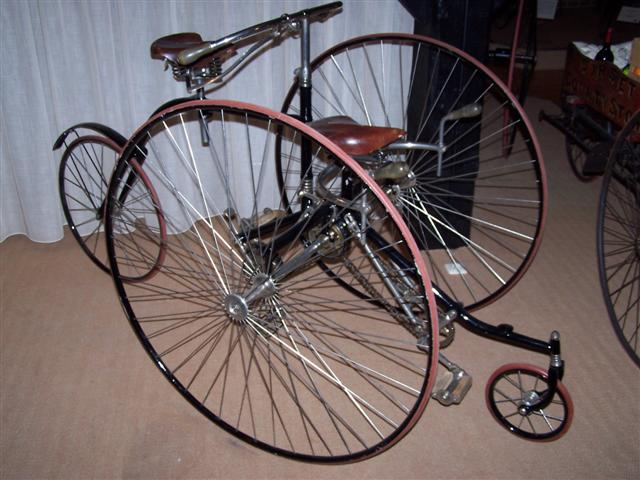
Quadracycle

The first period which may be called a bicycle craze actually refers to a precursor of the bicycle which was propelled by being pushed along with the feet as the rider straddled the contraption, and had no pedals. This machine was invented by Baron Karl von Drais in Germany, and was called variously a "draisine" (English) or "draisienne" (French) after his name, a "velocipede" from the Latin terms for "fast foot", a "hobby horse", or a "dandy horse", the last name being perhaps the most popular. Drais got a patent for his invention in 1818, and the craze swept Europe and the United States during the summer of 1819 while many manufacturers (notably Denis Johnson of London) either copied Drais's machine or created their own versions, then quickly died out as many pedestrians began to feel threatened by the machines, and as municipalities passed ordinances prohibiting their use.

During the next 43 years, chiefly in England, inventors continued to explore the concept of human-powered transport, but on vehicles with three or four wheels (called "tricycles" and "quadracycles" respectively), which were thought to be more stable since they did not require the balance necessary for two-wheeled vehicles. But none of these achieved much popularity.

== 1860s and 1870s ==
In the early 1860s the first true bicycle was created in Paris, France, by attaching rotary cranks and pedals to the front wheel hub of a dandy-horse. The Olivier brothers recognized the commercial potential of this invention, and set up a partnership with blacksmith and bicycle maker Pierre Michaux, using Michaux's name, already famous among enthusiasts of the new sport, for the company. They began the first mass-production of bicycles (still called "velocipedes") in 1868, as the first real bicycle craze had begun the year before, reaching full force all over Europe and America in 1868 and 1869. But exactly as with the dandy-horse, pedestrians complained about them, and the craze again faded quickly. Another factor in their demise was the extremely uncomfortable ride, because of the stiff wrought-iron frame and wooden wheels surrounded by tires made of iron – this led to the pejorative name "boneshaker", which is still used today to refer to this type of bicycle.

Again, England was the only place where the concept remained popular during the early 1870s. But the design changed drastically, with the front wheel becoming larger and larger, and with many other improvements making the ride more comfortable. This type of bicycle was known in its day as the "ordinary", but people later began calling it a "penny-farthing" because of the resemblance of its wheel sizes to the largest and smallest English copper coins of the time; it is also known as a "high-wheel". Front-wheel sizes quickly grew to as much as 5 feet (1.5 metres), and the bicycles were considered by the general public to be quite dangerous. In addition, they were expensive, and thus riders were mostly wealthy young men who formed an elite brotherhood. However, bicycle races were staged and well-attended by the public, which spread interest for the high-wheeler worldwide because of the far-flung British colonies, by the end of the decade. Albert Pope purchased Lallement's original patent and created his "Columbia" bicycle in the U.S. in 1878, and went on to manufacture thousands of bicycles.

== 1890s ==
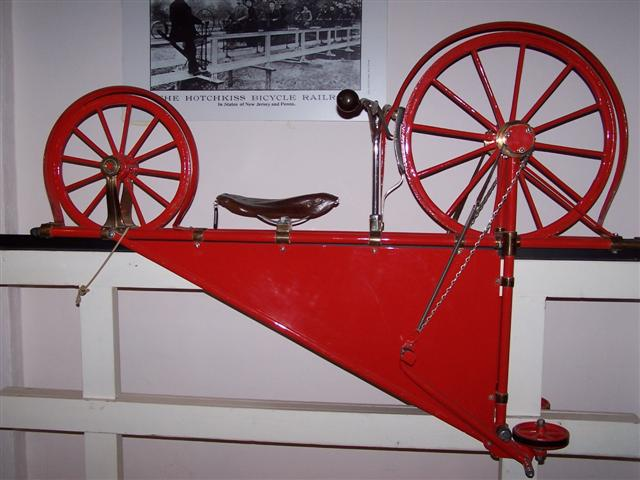
The Mount Holly and Smithville Bicycle Railway – 1892-1898

The 1890s saw one of the biggest bicycle crazes of all, driven by several significant developments in bicycles: the invention of the "safety bicycle" with its chain-drive transmission, whose gear ratios allowed smaller wheels without a concurrent loss of speed, and the subsequent invention of the pneumatic (inflatable air-filled) bicycle tire. Experiments with chain-drive had been attempted in 1869 and 1879, but the first well known chain-drive bicycle was the "Rover" produced in 1885 by John Kemp Starley. Very quickly, the penny-farthing passed out of fashion, and multitudes of people all over the world began riding the "safety".

13 September 1892 saw the opening of a Bicycle Railroad between Mount Holly, New Jersey and the H. B. Smith Manufacturing Company in Smithville, NJ during the Mount Holly fair, with 3,000 riders its first week (for amusement instead of commuting).

Coney Island wanted one, and the World's Columbian Exposition in Chicago featured one. Several others were built for amusement in Atlantic City, Ocean City and Gloucester City, NJ (the first two in 1893 and last in 1894).

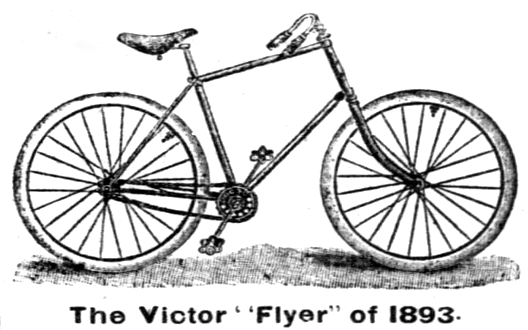
The Overman Victor Flyer, a popular safety bicycle during the 1890s

In the year 1896, there was simultaneously an increase in bicycle popularity and a severe economic depression. Bicycles were one of the few areas of the economy where sales were growing; people were buying bicycles "whether they could afford them or not". This attracted hundreds of manufacturers into the bicycle business. This increase in production resulted in a downward spiral of market saturation, over-supply and intense price competition. Many bicycle manufacturers, faced with excess inventory and prices too low to make a profit, went out of business. Several dozen bicycle companies consolidated into the American Bicycle Company in 1899.

The application of the internal-combustion engine to the bicycle during the 1890s resulted in the motorcycle.

== 20th century ==
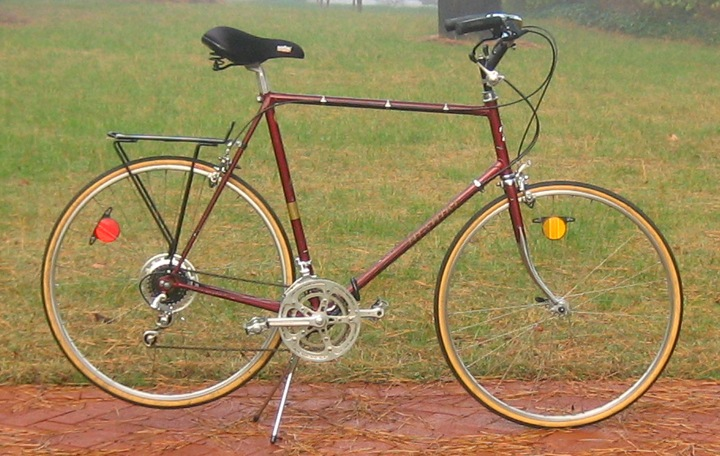
1977 Nishiki International Typical 1970s bike boom ten-speed road bike.

U.S. bike boom of 1965–1975: The period of 1965–1975 saw adult cycling increase sharply in popularity – with Time magazine calling it "the bicycle's biggest wave of popularity in its 154-year history" The period was followed by a sudden fall in sales, resulting in a large inventory of unsold bicycles. Seven million bicycles were sold in the U.S. in 1970. Of those, 5 1/2 million were children's bikes, 1.2 million were coaster brake, balloon-tired adult bicycles, and only 200,000 were lightweight 3-speed or derailleur-equipped bikes. Total bicycle sales had doubled by 1972 to 14 million – with children's bikes remaining constant at 5 1/2 million, adult balloon-tired bicycles falling to about 1/2 million, and lightweight bicycles exploding fortyfold, to 8 million. Time magazine reported in 1971 that "for the first time since the 1890s, nearly one-half of all bicycle production" was "geared for adults."

The boom received a kick start in the mid-1960s with the advent of the Schwinn Sting-Ray and other wheelie bikes. Sales reached 4 million units per year for the first time. At the height of the boom, in 1972, 1973, and 1974, more bicycles than automobiles were sold in the U.S.

Factors contributing to the U.S. bike boom included affordable and versatile 10-speed derailleur-geared racing bicycles becoming widely available, the arrival of many post-World War II baby boomers at adulthood and demanding inexpensive transportation for recreation and exercise, and increasing interest in reducing pollution. The 1973 oil crisis, which increased the cost of driving an automobile, making bicycle commuting a more attractive option, is commonly assumed to have propelled the bike boom, but in fact, bicycle sales had already peaked when the crisis struck in October, 1973.

The United Kingdom experienced a mountain bike boom during the 1990s. Road bike customers were seen as reluctant to spend money, while the mountain bike market offered new features such as suspensions and materials such as carbon fibre, aluminum and titanium. The market declined coinciding with the 2001 United Kingdom foot-and-mouth outbreak, which made mountain biking more difficult due to land closure. Since then it has barely recovered to the level of its prime years.

== 21st century ==
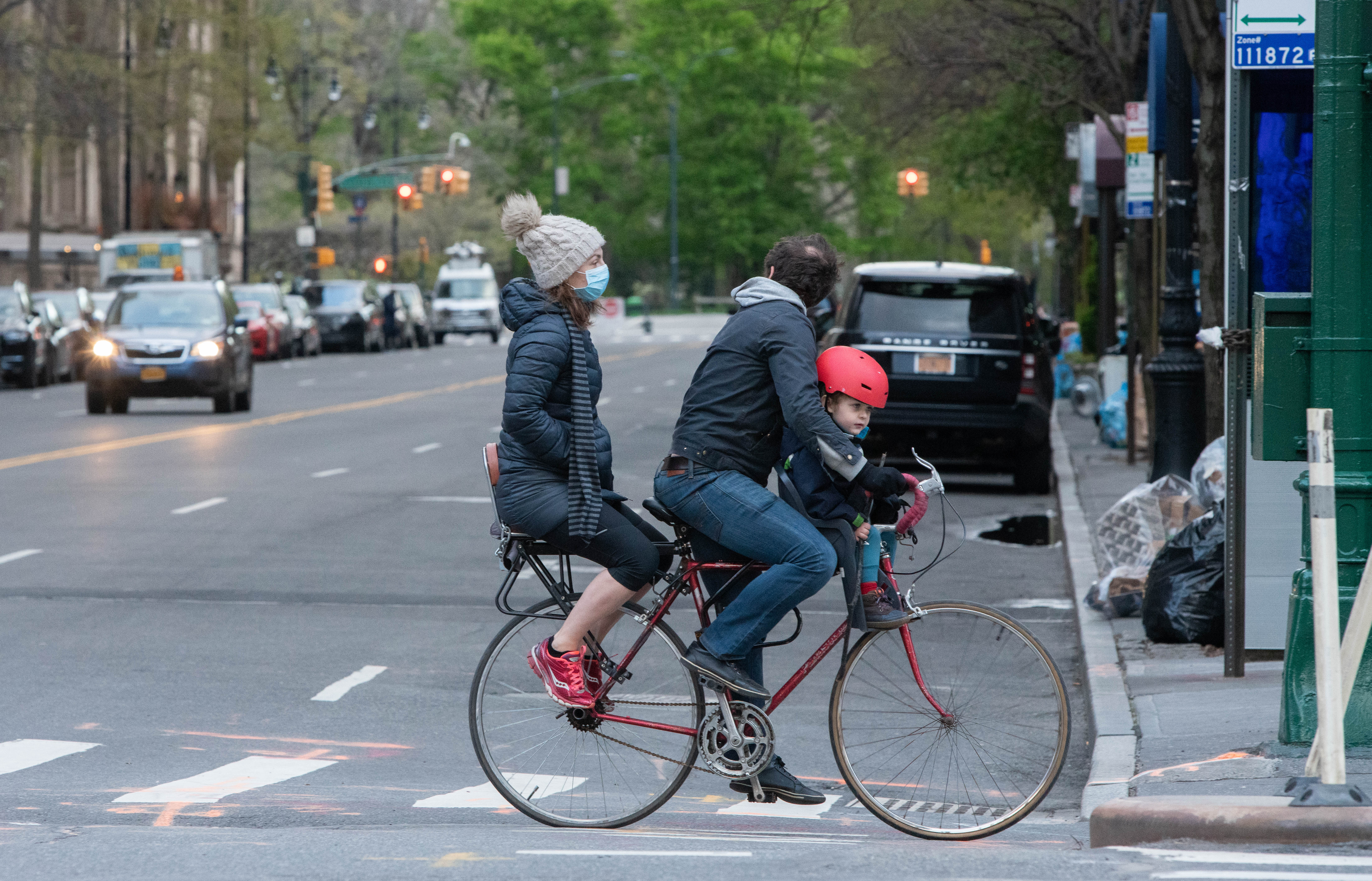
Cyclists in New York during the COVID-19 pandemic

In 2008, some industry analysts saw signs of surging bicycle popularity. The British press cited 2012 as a bike boom, fuelled by the successes that summer of UK cyclists in the Tour de France and at the London Olympics, Bradley Wiggins and Laura Kenny in particular, and the subsequent success in the Tour by Chris Froome.

In 2016, Simon Mottram of the cycling clothing brand Rapha traced the boom back to the after-effects of the 7 July 2005 London bombings, which closed parts of the Tube and encouraged many commuters onto bicycles. Two years later, the Tour de France started in London on the anniversary of the attack, and the following year Team GB dominated cycling at the Beijing Olympics. He also credits the financial incentive of the Cycle to Work scheme (introduced in 1999), and the increasing emphasis on health and congestion. British Cycling, the sport's governing body, claimed that over "two million people across the country now cycle at least once a week, an all-time high". Halfords, responsible for a third of bikes sold in the UK, reported an increase of sales of 11% up to March 2015. Many customers are younger men, and the most rapidly growing group is women. One of the older men, the architecture writer and cycle campaigner Peter Murray, described how business relationships are created and nurtured during longer rides; the BBC referred to cycling being "the new golf" in this sense." This led to the construction of cycle lane networks in Greater London and later Greater Manchester.

With the development of technology, the 2010s also saw the rise of bicycle-sharing systems around the world, as well as a surge in popularity for electric bicycles, or e-bikes.

2020 saw a bike boom when the COVID-19 pandemic took hold. People looked to bicycles for something to do during quarantine, exercise and as an alternative to public transportation that allowed for physical distancing to minimize the risk of infection. The increase in demand and the impairment of bicycle production worldwide led to shortages of the vehicles. This lasted up until March 2021 with the industry collapsing to 1970s level, commencing with closure of shops caused by rising costs and revenues from manufacturers declining.

== See also ==
- Balloonomania
- Canal mania
- Cyclability
- Railway mania
- Cars in the 1920s
- 1950s American automobile culture
- American automobile industry in the 1950s
- Bicycling and feminism
- Mamil, an acronym standing for "middle-aged man in lycra"
- Timeline of transportation technology
