= 1869 Paris–Rouen cycle race =

1869 cycle race

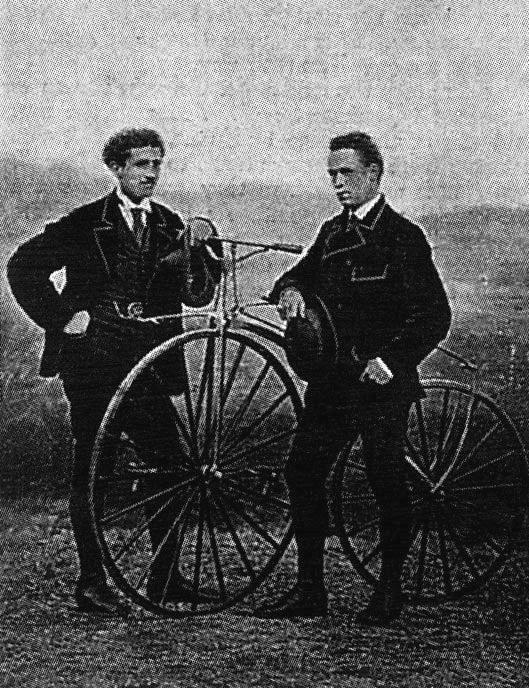
Winner James Moore (right) and Jean-Eugène-André Castera at Paris–Rouen

Paris–Rouen was the first cycle race covering a distance between two cities. It was held between the cities of Paris and Rouen on 7 November 1869. The winner of the inaugural race was an Englishman living in Paris, James Moore, who rode the 123 kilometres dividing both cities in 10 hours and 40 minutes, including time spent walking his bicycle up the steeper hills.

The event was organized by the fortnightly cycling magazine Le Vélocipède illustré and the Olivier brothers. They were delighted with the success of short races held in Parc de Saint Cloud, Paris and on 7 November they promoted a race between Paris and Rouen, covering a distance of 123 kilometres. The first prize was one thousand gold francs and a bicycle. The rules of the race said that the riders were not to be pulled by a dog or use sails.

A total of 120 riders, including two women, participated in the race but just 32 finished within 24 hours. James Moore won, finishing 15 minutes ahead of Castera and Bobillier. The first woman, referred to as Miss America, finishing in 29th position - 12 hours and 10 minutes after Moore.

The race was not held after the outbreak of Franco-Prussian War in 1870, but it later returned as an amateur race. The centenary was commemorated on 12 May 1969, and was won by Régis Delepine, who received the same prize as James Moore, one thousand gold francs equivalent to 50 Louis.

== General Standings ==
=== Table of results ===
	Cyclist	Time
1	James Moore (GBR)	10h 45'
2	Jean-Eugène-André Castéra (FRA)	15'
3	Jean Bobillier (FRA)	s.t.
4	Henri Pascaud (FRA)	1h 15'
5	Félix-Gaston Biot (FRA)	1h 39'
6	Georges Cantellauve (FRA)	2h 54'
7	Edouard-Charles Bon (FRA)	3h 05'
8	John Thomas "Leon Lamberte" Johnson (GBR)	3h 40'
9	Joseph Meunier (FRA)	3h 50'
10	Hinton Shand (GBR)	4h 33'
11	Eugène Meyer (FRA)	4h 43'
12	Louis Tribout (FRA)	4h 45'
13	A.E. Guillot (FRA)	5h 07'
14	François Stoeckel (FRA)	5h 11'
15	Rémy Lamon (FRA)	6h 44'
16	Servoz (FRA)	6h 50'
17	Henri "R.R. - Raoul Richard" Pagis (FRA)	7h 10'
18	Delage (FRA)	7h 20'
19	Gustave Obrecht (FRA)	7h 25'
20	Victor Leroy d'Étiolles (FRA)	7h 30'
21	Venant (FRA)	7h 35'
22	Pierre Wolff (FRA)	7h 45'
23	Daubel (FRA)	7h 48'
24	Rocan (FRA)	7h 53'
25	Duval (FRA)	s.t.
26	J. Château (FRA)	8h 20'
27	Tricycle Tissier (FRA)	9h 20'
28	Ludovic Constanceau (FRA)	10h 30'
29	James "Pedro" Trémau (FRA)	11h 50'
30	Elisabeth Sarti "Miss America" (FRA)	12h 10'
31	Rowley Benbow Turner (GBR)	s.t.
32	Emile Taboureau (FRA)	s.t.
33	Ch. Châtelain (FRA)	12h 35'
34	Eugène Fortin (FRA)	14h 20'
35	Prosper Martin (FRA)	s.t.
