= Olivier brothers =

French bicycle manufacturers

The Olivier brothers, Aimé, René, and Marius, were among the first people responsible for recognizing the commercial potential of the bicycle.

The Olivier family was wealthy, owning multiple chemical plants in France. The family were based in Lyon. While students in Paris in 1864, the brothers were among the first users of the velocipede. In 1868, the Oliviers formed a partnership with Pierre Michaux to mass-produce bicycles.

All through one of the first bicycle crazes, from 1867 to 1869, it was René Olivier who led both the Michaux company and the industry as a whole. Then several major problems developed. The cast-iron frames would sometimes fail catastrophically. The relationship between the brothers and Michaud also broke down.

In 1869, René formed his own Compagnie Parisienne bicycle factory. However, the bicycle craze in France (and in the United States) ended that year. The bicycle's popularity continued only in England; it was inventors and manufacturers there who contributed the next series of improvements to its development.

The Compagnie Parisienne is unrelated to the Societe Parisienne, which was founded in 1876 also to manufacture bicycles.
