= Robert Gober =

American sculptor

- Untitled (1992), mixed media, installed at Glenstone
- Born: September 12, 1954 (age 72); Wallingford, Connecticut, US
- Education: Middlebury College, Vermont, Tyler School of Art in Rome
- Known for: Sculpture

Robert Gober (born September 12, 1954) is an American sculptor. His work is often related to domestic and familiar objects such as sinks, doors, and legs.

== Early life and education ==
Untitled (Leg) (1989–1990)

Short Haired Cheese (1992–1993) at the Metropolitan Museum of Art in 2022

Gober was born in Wallingford, Connecticut. Gober settled in New York in 1976 and initially earned his living as a carpenter, crafting stretchers for artists and renovating lofts. He also worked as an assistant to the painter Elizabeth Murray for five years.

== Work ==
In 1982–83, Gober created Slides of a Changing Painting, consisting of 89 images of paintings made on a small piece of plywood in his storefront studio in the East Village; he made a slide of each motif, then scraped off the paint and began again. One of his most well known series of more than 50 increasingly eccentric sinks – made of plaster, wood, wire lath, and coated in layers of semi-gloss enamel – he produced in the mid-1980s.

By 1989, Gober was casting beeswax into sculptures of men's legs, completed not only with shoes and trouser legs but also human hair that was inserted into the beeswax.

In the Whitney Biennial 2012, Gober curated a room of Forrest Bess's paintings and archival materials dealing with the artist's exploration into hermaphrodism.

== Role during the AIDS epidemic ==
During the AIDS epidemic in the 1980s, Robert Gober, along with other artists, used art to support the AIDS Coalition to Unleash Power (ACT UP). ACT UP was a large group of people that were infuriated by the lack of action from the government and scientists to stop the spread of AIDS and find a cure. A few artists, including Gober, organized an art auction to help raise funds to donate to ACT UP. Gober's Untitled (Leg) (1989–1990) alone was sold at a very high price, which helped prove to the public that art can be used to make the voices of the people be heard, to fight for a cause that is important to the communities, and that art is not just a commodity, nor is art just for pleasure.

== Exhibitions ==
In 1984, the Paula Cooper Gallery in New York hosted Gober's first solo exhibition. The Art Institute of Chicago presented the artist's first museum exhibition in 1988. Gober has since had exhibitions of his work in Europe and North America. He represented the United States at the 2001 Venice Biennale

In 2007 there was a retrospective exhibition of his work at the Schaulager in Basel.

Gober participated in the group show Lifelike that originated at the Walker Art Center in 2012.

From October 2014 to January 2015, The Museum of Modern Art, New York presented "Robert Gober: The Heart Is Not a Metaphor", a 40-year retrospective of his work including approximately 130 sculptures, paintings, drawings, prints and photographs. This exhibition was the first large-scale display in the United States. It was also accompanied by a catalogue of the same name including essays by Hilton Als, Ann Temkin and Christian Scheidemann, plus a chronology by Claudia Carson and Paulina Pobocha with Robert Gober.

In autumn 2016, two new sculptures by Gober were included in the Artangel exhibition at Reading Prison in England.

== Recognition ==
In 2013, the Hammer Museum honored Gober along with playwright Tony Kushner at its 11th Annual Gala in the Garden, with Gober being introduced by fellow artist Charles Ray.

== Aesthetics ==
Traditionally the poetics associated with Robert Gober's artworks are focused on two fields: The surreal and the spiritual: "The almost devotional artisanship imbues common objects with an uncommon gravity, along with the sense of energy, growth and vulnerability that defines real bodies." Roberta Smith. “He plays with the tension between the neutered forms and the strong emotional and physical connotations we attach to them.” His artworks represent "The daily human war on dirt " Peter Schjeldahl., it works both literally and symbolically. "To be cleansed is to become pure, physically and also spiritually." In some cases the lavatories represent both the cyclical approach to be cleaner but the impossibility to be fully pure: "The sink still has no water, and the past will never wash off."

== Personal life ==
Gober lives with his partner Donald Moffett. They reside in New York City and Maine.

Gober served on the board of directors of the Foundation for Contemporary Arts (FCA).

== Notable works in public collections ==
- Double Sink (1984), Art Institute of Chicago
- Untitled (Sink) (1984), Rubell Museum, Miami
- The Slanted Sink (1985), National Gallery of Art, Washington, D.C.
- Single Basin Sink (1985), Los Angeles County Museum of Art
- The Subconscious Sink (1985), Walker Art Center, Minneapolis
- Three Parts of an X (1985), Hirshhorn Museum and Sculpture Garden, Smithsonian Institution, Washington, D.C.
- Two Urinals (1986), Glenstone, Potomac, Maryland
- Two Partially Buried Sinks (1986–1987), Glenstone, Potomac, Maryland
- Untitled Door and Door Frame (1986–1987), Walker Art Center, Minneapolis
- Untitled Closet (1989), Glenstone, Potomac, Maryland
- Untitled Leg (1989–1990), Museum of Modern Art, New York
- Drains (1990), Tate, London
- Untitled (1990), Hirshhorn Museum and Sculpture Garden, Smithsonian Institution, Washington, D.C.
- Untitled (1990), San Francisco Museum of Modern Art
- Untitled (1991), Museum of Modern Art, New York
- Prison Window (1992), Museum of Modern Art, New York
- Untitled (1992), Glenstone, Potomac, Maryland
- Short Haired Cheese (1992–1993), Metropolitan Museum of Art, New York
- Untitled (1993–1994), Crystal Bridges Museum of American Art, Bentonville, Arkansas; and Whitney Museum, New York
- Untitled (2000–2001), Art Institute of Chicago
- Untitled (2003), Hirshhorn Museum and Sculpture Garden, Smithsonian Institution, Washington, D.C.
- Untitled (2003–2005), Museum of Modern Art, New York
- Untitled (2006–2007), Musée National d'Art Moderne, Paris
- Heart in a Box (2014–2015), Whitney Museum, New York
