= Mitchell Rales =

American businessman and art curator (born 1956)

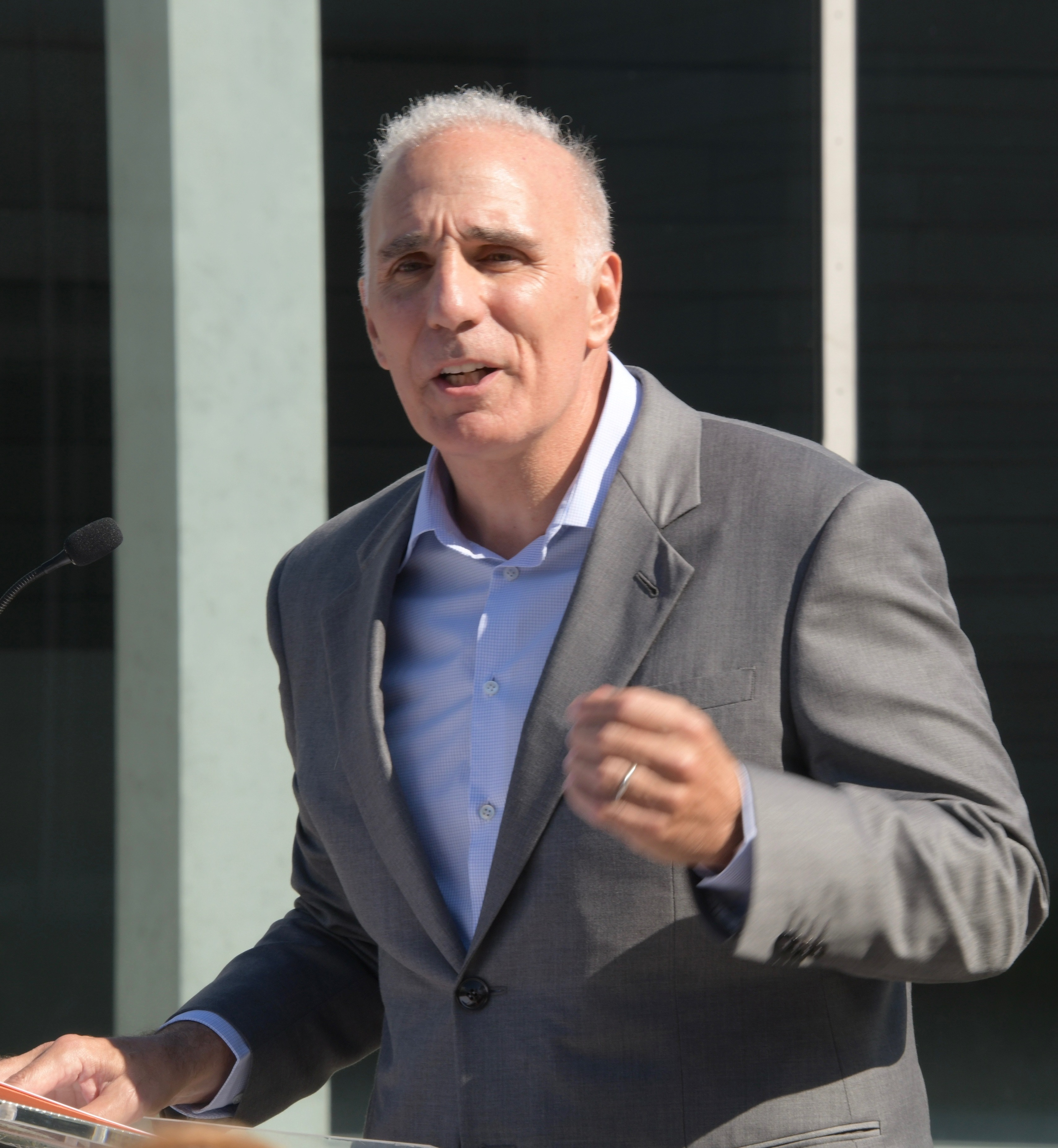
- Rales in 2018
- Born: August 1956 (age 70); Pittsburgh, Pennsylvania, U.S.
- Education: Miami University (BBA)
- Occupations: Businessman; art curator
- Known for: Co-founding Danaher and Glenstone
- Title: Chairman; ESAB; Limited partner; Washington Commanders (NFL)
- Board member of: Danaher; ESAB
- Spouses: Lyn Goldthorp (div. 1999); Emily Wei (m. 2008)
- Children: 2
- Family: Steven Rales (brother)

Mitchell P. Rales (born August 1956) is an American businessman and art curator. He co-founded Danaher Corporation with his brother Steven Rales in 1984 and the art museum Glenstone with his wife Emily Wei in 2006. Rales is also the chairman of ESAB and the leading limited partner of the National Football League (NFL) team Washington Commanders, as well as the former president of the National Gallery of Art. Rales has an estimated net worth of $4 billion as of 2025.

== Early life ==
Rales was born in August 1956 in Pittsburgh, Pennsylvania, and grew up in Bethesda, Maryland. He graduated from Walt Whitman High School in 1974, where he was captain of their football and baseball teams. Rales earned a degree in business administration at Miami University in 1978 and was a member of Beta Theta Pi fraternity.

== Career ==
=== Business ===
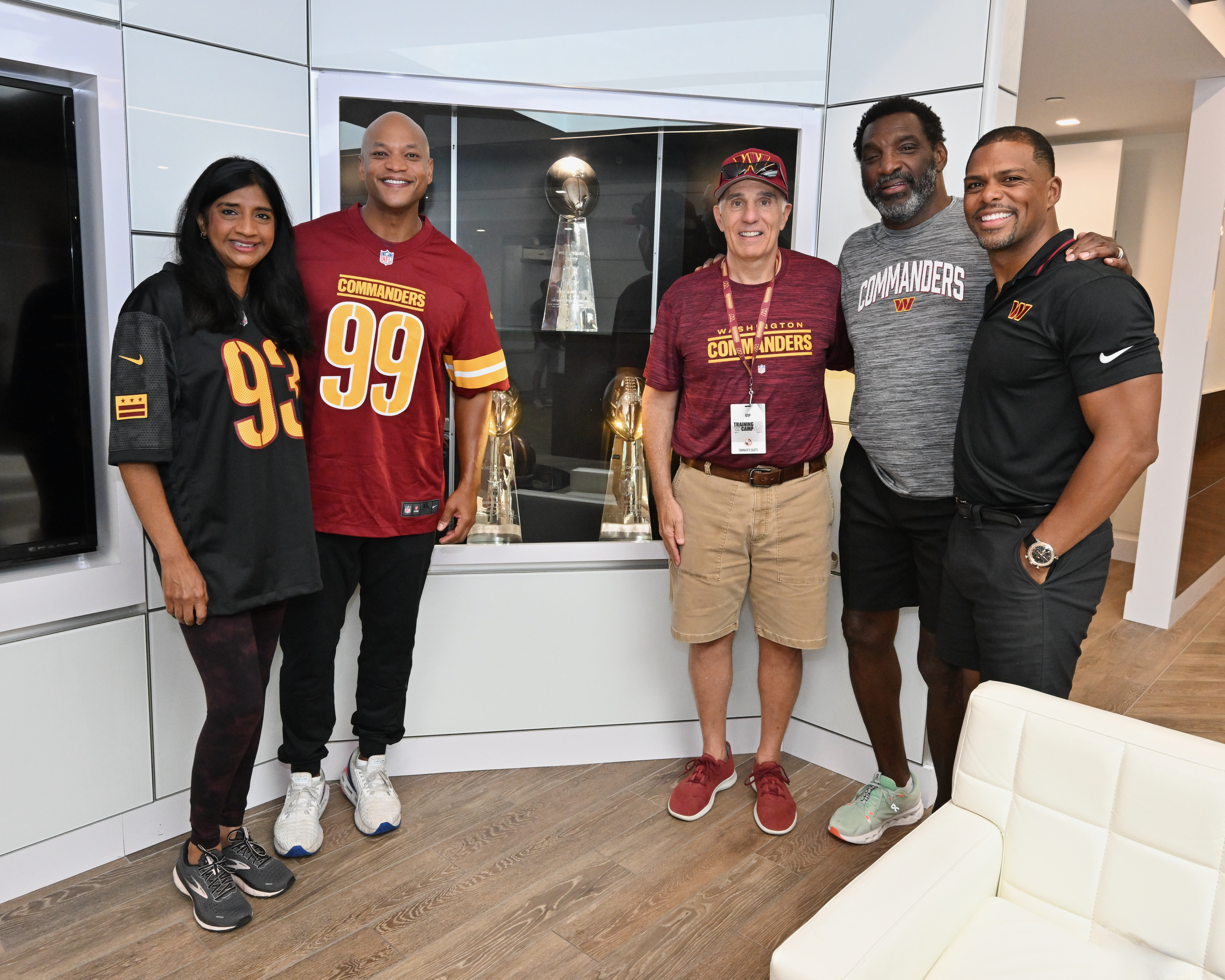
Rales (center) with Maryland governors Aruna Miller and Wes Moore and Washington Commanders executives Doug Williams and Jason Wright, 2023

In 1979, Rales left his father's real estate firm to found Equity Group Holdings with his brother, Steven Rales. Using junk bonds, they bought a diversified line of businesses. In 1978, they changed the name to Diversified Mortgage Investors and then to Danaher in 1984. In the 1980s, the AM side of radio station WGMS was sold off to Rales, who converted it WTEM, a sports-talk station, in 1992. In 1988, he made a takeover bid of Interco, which was the largest manufacturer of furniture and men's shoes in the U.S. at the time. He later ended the bid after five months with a profit of $60 million.

In 1995, Rales and his brother founded Colfax Corporation, an industrial pumps manufacturer later rebranded as Enovis in 2022. He is a majority shareholder of Fortive, which split off from Danaher in 2016, and served on their board of directors until June 2021. In 2017, Rales paid a fine of $720,000 to the Federal Trade Commission after erroneously reporting purchases of shares in Colfax and Danaher were not above the filing threshold, which violated the Hart–Scott–Rodino Antitrust Improvements Act. He had previously been fined $850,000 by the U.S. Department of Justice in 1991 for violating the same act after buying Interco.

In July 2023, Rales became the top limited partner in a group headed by Josh Harris that acquired the National Football League (NFL) team Washington Commanders for $6.05 billion. He considered the opportunity to be "humbling", as he grew up a fan of the team and frequently attended home games at RFK Stadium.

=== Art ===
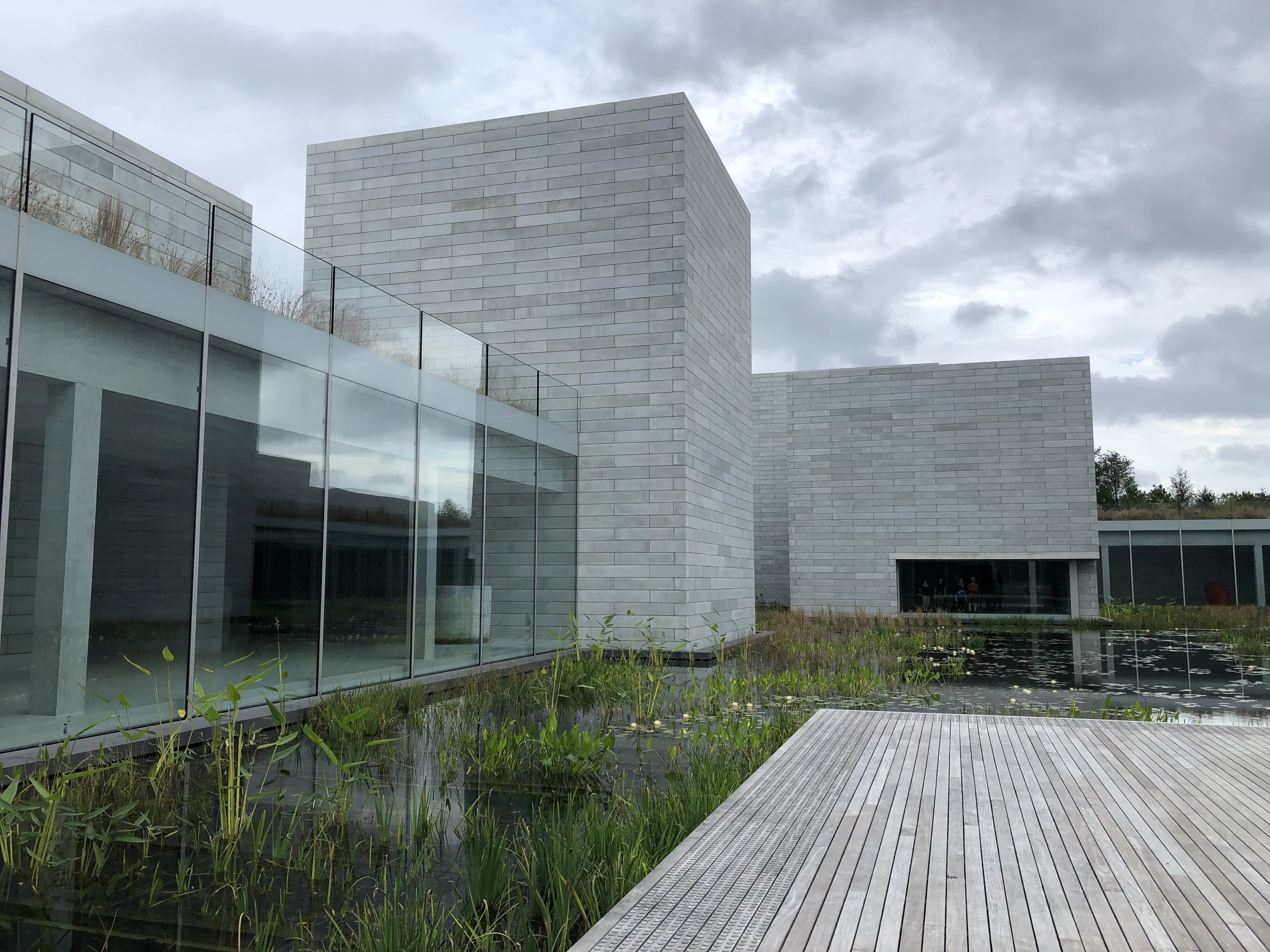
Glenstone, an art museum founded with his wife in 2006

In 2006, Rales and his wife Emily Wei Rales established the art museum Glenstone in Potomac, Maryland. Rales had owned the land since 1986 and had previously made it his residence. Glenstone displays the Rales's collection of post-World War II art, including paintings, sculptures, and both indoor and outdoor installations, and also functions as his personal residence. In 2018, Glenstone finished a $219 million expansion which increased both the gallery space and the wooded land surrounding the galleries. Rales donated $1.9 billion to the Glenstone Foundation in 2021, increasing the museum's asset value to $4.6 billion, nearly the same as the Metropolitan Museum of Art in New York. The museum is free to visit via online booking. Rales was president of the National Gallery of Art from 2019 to 2024, succeeded by Darren Walker.

== Personal life ==
Rales is Jewish and is one of four sons (Joshua, Steven, and Stewart) of Norman and Ruth Rales (née Abramson). Norman was raised in the Hebrew Orphan Asylum of New York and later became a businessman, who sold his building supply company in Washington, D.C. to his employees in what was the first employee stock ownership plan (ESOP) transaction in the US. Norman was also a philanthropist, having founded the Norman and Ruth Rales Foundation and the Ruth Rales Jewish Family Service. In 1988, he took a fishing trip in Russia and nearly died after a plane exploded near the helicopter he was traveling on.

Rales has been married twice. He and his first wife, Lyn Goldthorp Rales, had two children before a divorce in 1999. He married his second wife, Emily Wei, in 2008. He lives in Potomac, Maryland. Rales was the president of the National Gallery of Art from 2019 to 2024, and is chairman of the board of ESAB. He is a former board member of the Hirshhorn Museum and Sculpture Garden and retired as chair of Enovis in 2023. The same year, he was elected as a member of the Business, Corporate, and Philanthropic Leadership class of the American Academy of Arts and Sciences. Rales signed The Giving Pledge in 2019, with his net worth being estimated by Forbes in June 2025 to be $4 billion.
