= Thomas Phifer =

American architect

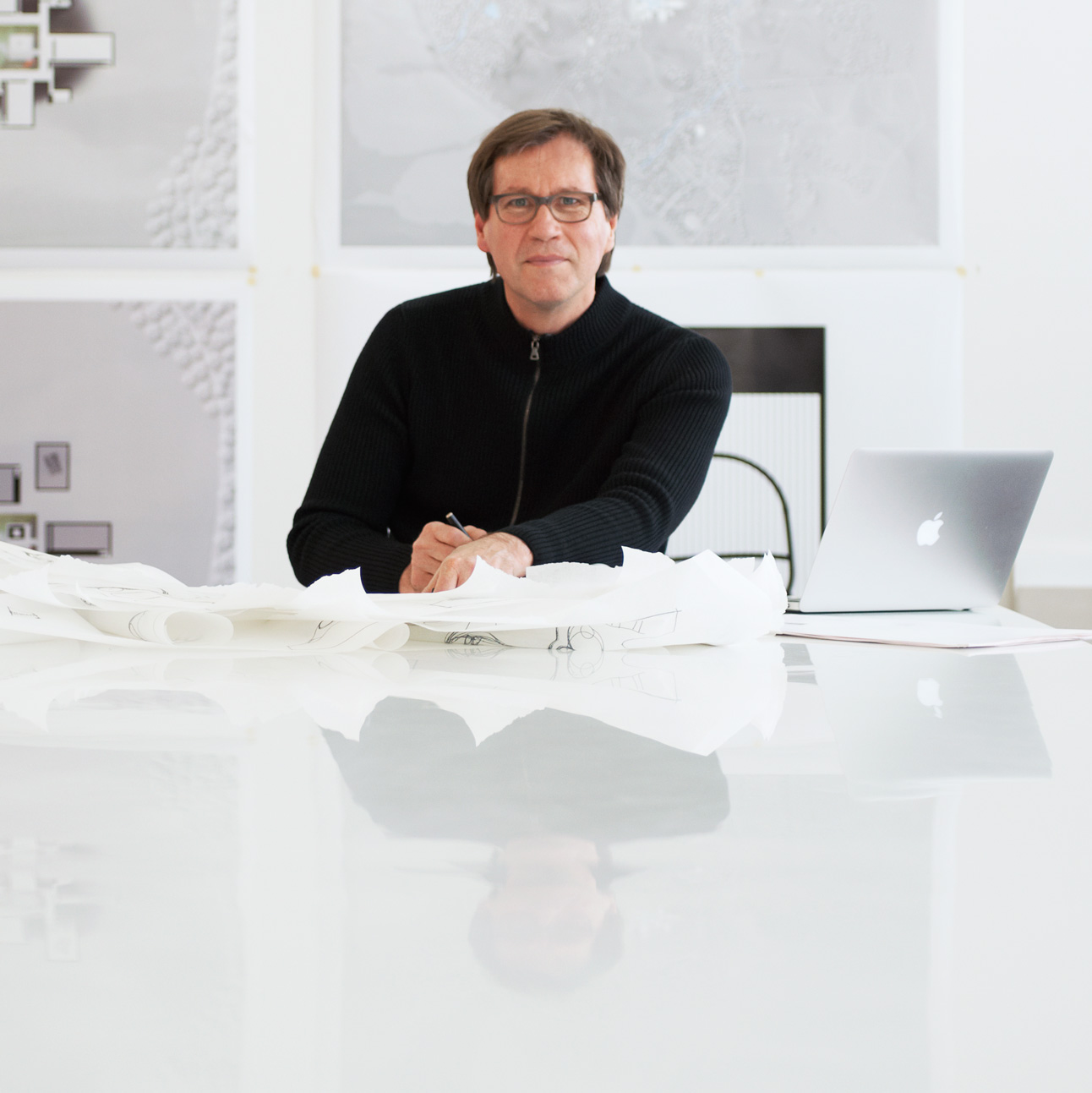
- The architect in his New York City office
- Born: 1953; South Carolina, U.S.
- Occupation: Architect
- Buildings: Museum of Modern Art, Warsaw; Glenstone; North Carolina Museum of Art; Orrin G. Hatch United States Courthouse

Thomas Phifer is an American architect based in New York City.

Phifer is best known for his design of the Glenstone Museum expansion in Potomac, Maryland, the North Carolina Museum of Art in Raleigh, North Carolina, the Corning Museum of Glass Contemporary Art + Design expansion, and the Brochstein Pavilion at Rice University in Houston, Texas.

Phifer designed the new Museum of Modern Art in Warsaw, located on the northern side of Plac Defilad next to the Palace of Culture and Science. It was completed and opened in 2024.

Around 2006, Phifer won the City Lights Design Competition, for his design of standard LED streetlights which replaced New York City’s high-pressure sodium streetlights starting in 2011.

== Biography ==
Phifer was born in Columbia, South Carolina. He earned a Bachelor of Architecture degree in 1975 and a Master of Architecture degree in 1977, both from Clemson University. He also studied at the Daniel Center for Architecture and Urban Studies in Genoa, Italy in 1976.

Phifer held the Stevenson Chair at the University of Texas and taught at Cornell University and the University of Pennsylvania. He served as the Louis I. Kahn Visiting Professor of Architectural Design at the Yale School of Architecture. He taught the Feltman Seminar at Cooper Union in the spring of 2022.

Phifer established his firm Thomas Phifer and Partners in 1997. after a decade of working for Richard Meier.

== Reception and awards ==
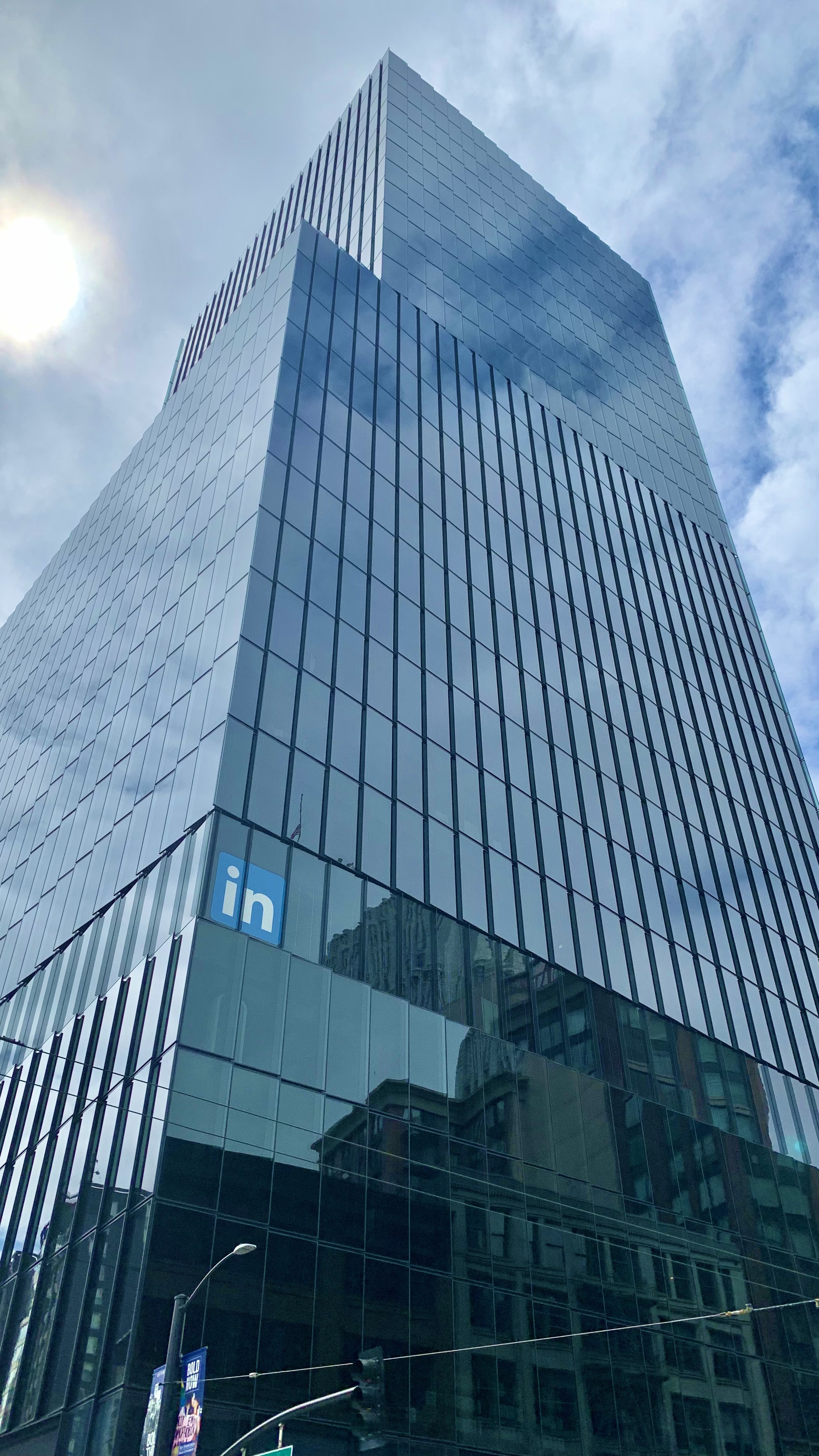
222 Second Street (San Francisco)

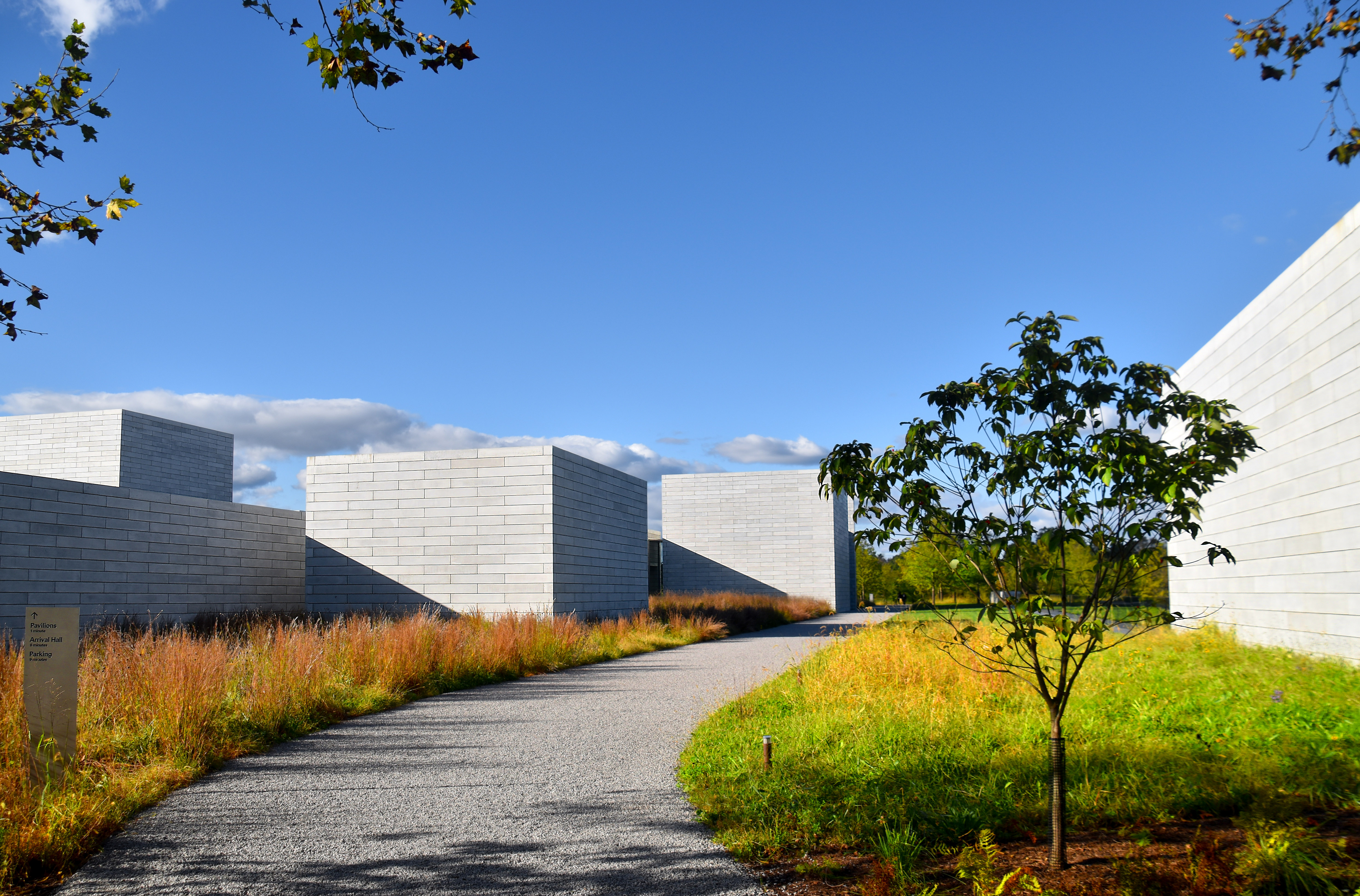
Glenstone

In 2022, Phifer was elected as a lifetime member to the American Academy of Arts and Letters. That year, his Hudson Valley House II won an Architecture Honor Award from the New York Chapter of the AIA.

In 2020, Phifer's expansion of Glenstone won a National Honor Award from the American Institute of Architects and the "Best in Competition" Award from the New York Chapter of the AIA.

In 2020, Phifer's Corning Museum of Glass expansion won a National Honor Award for Interior Architecture from the AIA. The project also won an Merit Award for Architecture from the New York Chapter of the AIA in 2016.

In 2013, Phifer was awarded the Architecture Award from the American Academy of Arts and Letters.

Phifer was also elected as an Academician for the National Academy of Design in 2012.

In 2011, Phifer received a Fellowship from the American Institute of Architects. The North Carolina Museum of Art, received a National Honor Award from the AIA in 2011.

In 2010, the Raymond and Susan Brochstein Pavilion received a National Honor Award from the AIA and an Honor Award from the American Academy of Landscape Architecture.

In 2009, he received a Research and Development Award from Architect magazine for his international competition-winning design for New York City's City Lights light fixture.

Phifer's Salt Point House won an American Architecture Award from the Chicago Atheneum in 2008.

In 2004, Phifer was awarded the Medal of Honor from the New York Chapter of the American Institute of Architects (AIA). That year, he received National Honor Awards from the AIA for both Steelcase and Taghkanic House.

Phifer received the Rome Prize in Architecture from the American Academy in Rome in 1995, and was honored with a residency the following year at the Academy's campus.

The San Francisco Chronicle's architecture critic John King described Phifer as "a master of meticulous modernism who has won praise for gem-like private homes and such cultural facilities as [the 2015] addition to the Corning Museum of Glass", but criticized 222 Second Street (completed by Tishman Speyer in 2016) as "designed and built by New Yorkers" without taking the building's San Francisco surroundings into account.

== Works ==
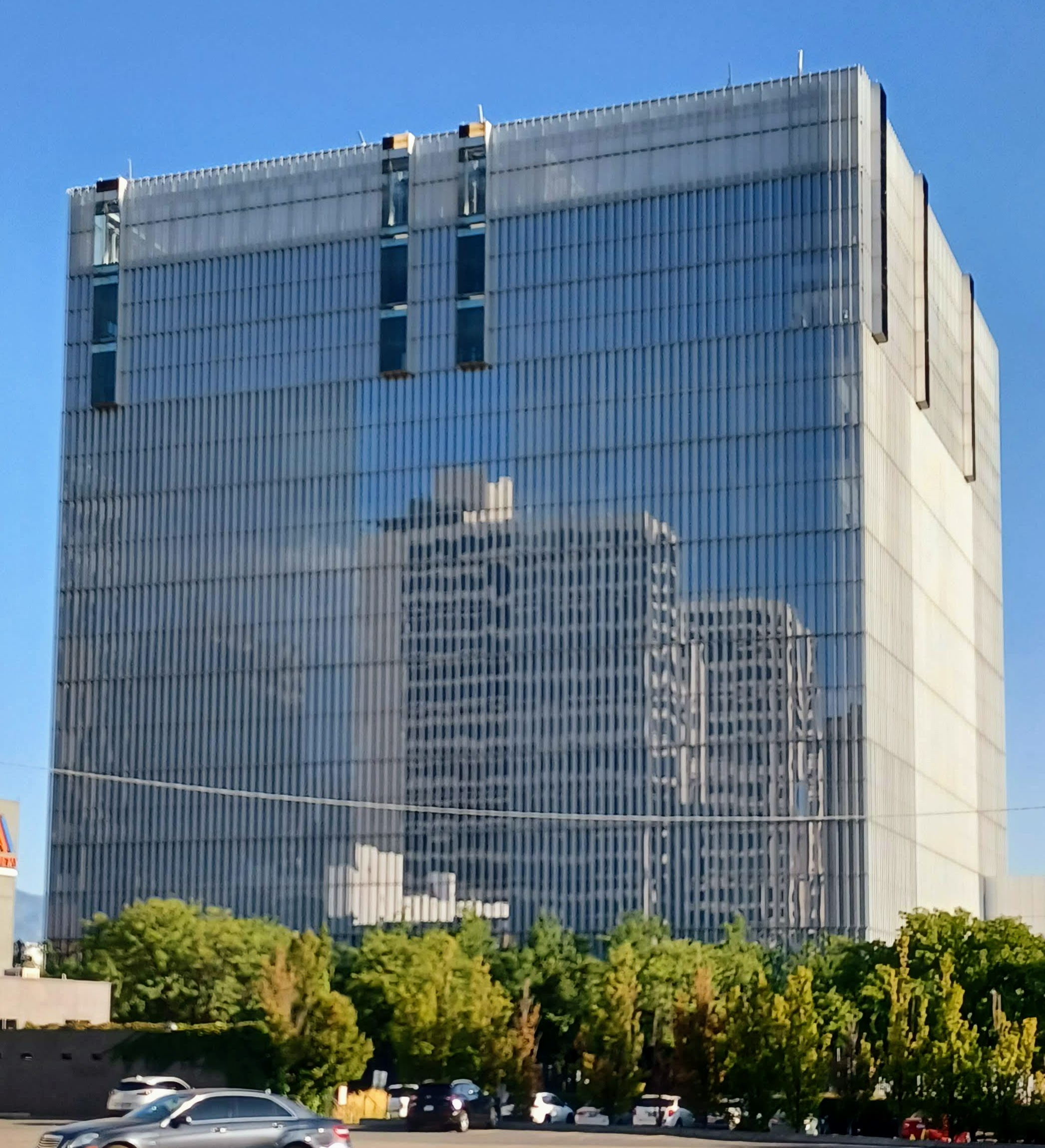
Orrin G. Hatch United States Courthouse

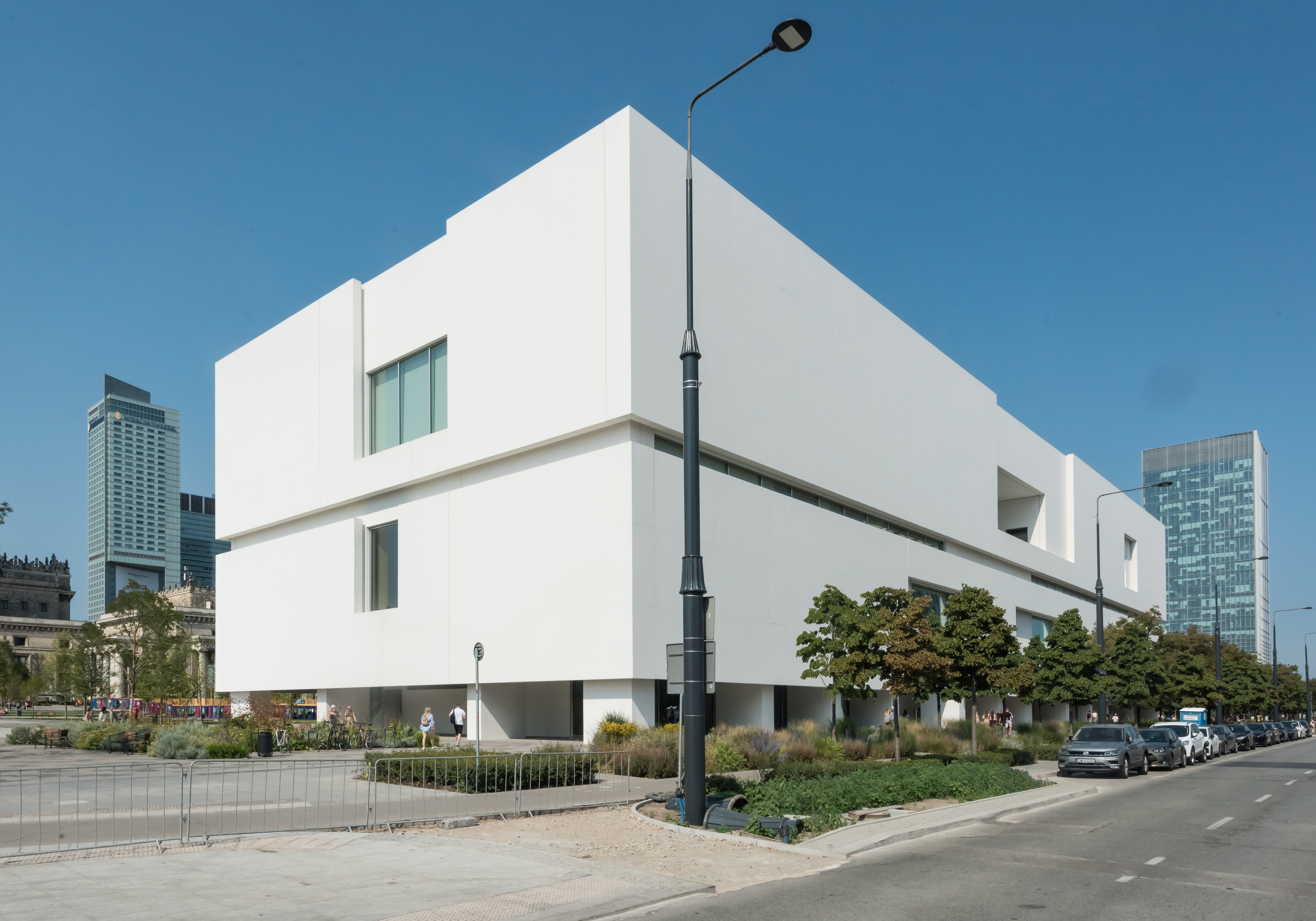
Museum of Modern Art, Warsaw

- North Carolina Museum of Art in Raleigh, North Carolina, 2010
- Pavilion in Wagner Park, New York City
- Raymond and the Susan Brochstein Pavilion at Rice University in Houston, Texas
- Salt Point House, Hudson River Valley, New York
- Millbrook House in the Hudson River Valley, New York
- Taghkanic House in the Hudson River Valley, New York
- Castle Clinton National Monument in Manhattan, New York
- Boulder House in Boulder, Colorado
- Clemson University Lee Hall Expansion in Clemson, South Carolina, 2012
- Fishers Island House in Long Island, New York
- Sagaponac House, New York
- Seoul Language School in Seoul, South Korea
- Steelcase, Inc. Headquarters in Grand Rapids, Michigan
- U.S. Courthouse for the District of Utah in Salt Lake City, Utah
- Spencertown House in Spencertown, New York
- Glenstone in Potomac, Maryland
- Corning Museum of Glass addition in Corning, New York, completed in 2015
- LED Light Fixture, New York City‘s City Lights Design Competition
- 222 Second Street in San Francisco (Phifer's first commercial tower, housing offices of LinkedIn), opened in 2016
- Red River Canopy Walk skyway in Austin, Texas
- Museum of Modern Art, Warsaw, completed in 2024
