= Emily Wei Rales =

Canadian-American art curator (born 1976)

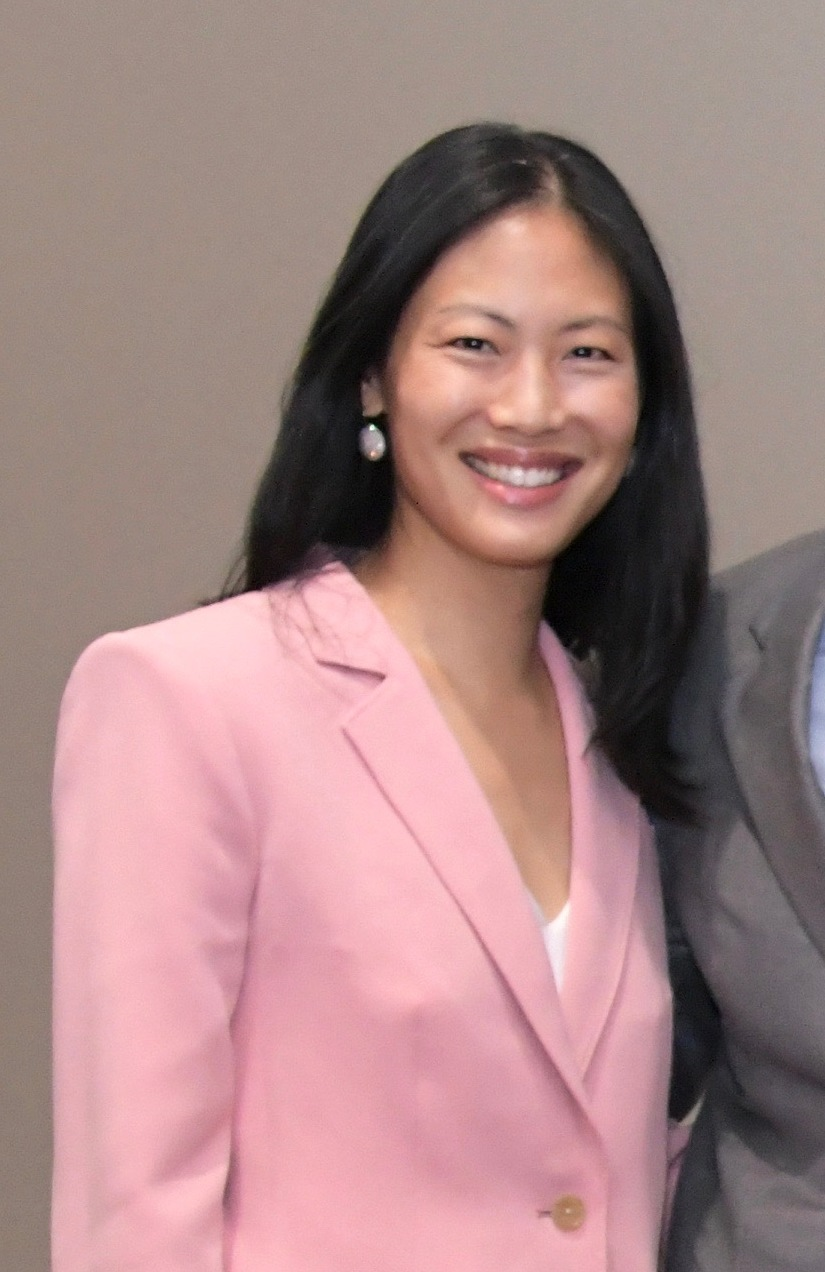
- Rales in 2018
- Born: Emily Wei; 1976 (age 49–50); Vancouver, British Columbia, Canada
- Education: Wellesley College (BA)
- Title: Director of the Glenstone
- Spouse: Mitchell Rales (m. 2008)

Emily Wei Rales (born 1976) is a Canadian-American art curator and historian. She is the director of Glenstone, an art museum in Potomac, Maryland, which she founded along with her husband, the American businessman Mitchell Rales.

== Early life ==
Rales was born Emily Wei in 1976 in Vancouver, British Columbia, as the daughter of Taiwanese Canadian immigrants. She became interested in art while studying at Wellesley College in Wellesley, Massachusetts, eventually graduating with a degree in art history and Chinese studies.

== Career ==
Rales's art career began as an intern at the Solomon R. Guggenheim Museum in New York City. Rales then worked at Barbara Gladstone's gallery and the J.J. Lally & Co gallery in New York, where she specialized in Chinese antiquities. Rales also ran a small non-profit called "Hudson Clearing", which produced small exhibitions in temporary spaces.

== Personal life ==
Rales met the American businessman Mitchell Rales in 2005 and began to work for him soon after. They married in 2008 and reside at Glenstone in Potomac, Maryland. She is a director of the non-profit Foundation for Contemporary Arts. The couple signed the Giving Pledge in 2019.
