= Lee III Hall of Clemson University =

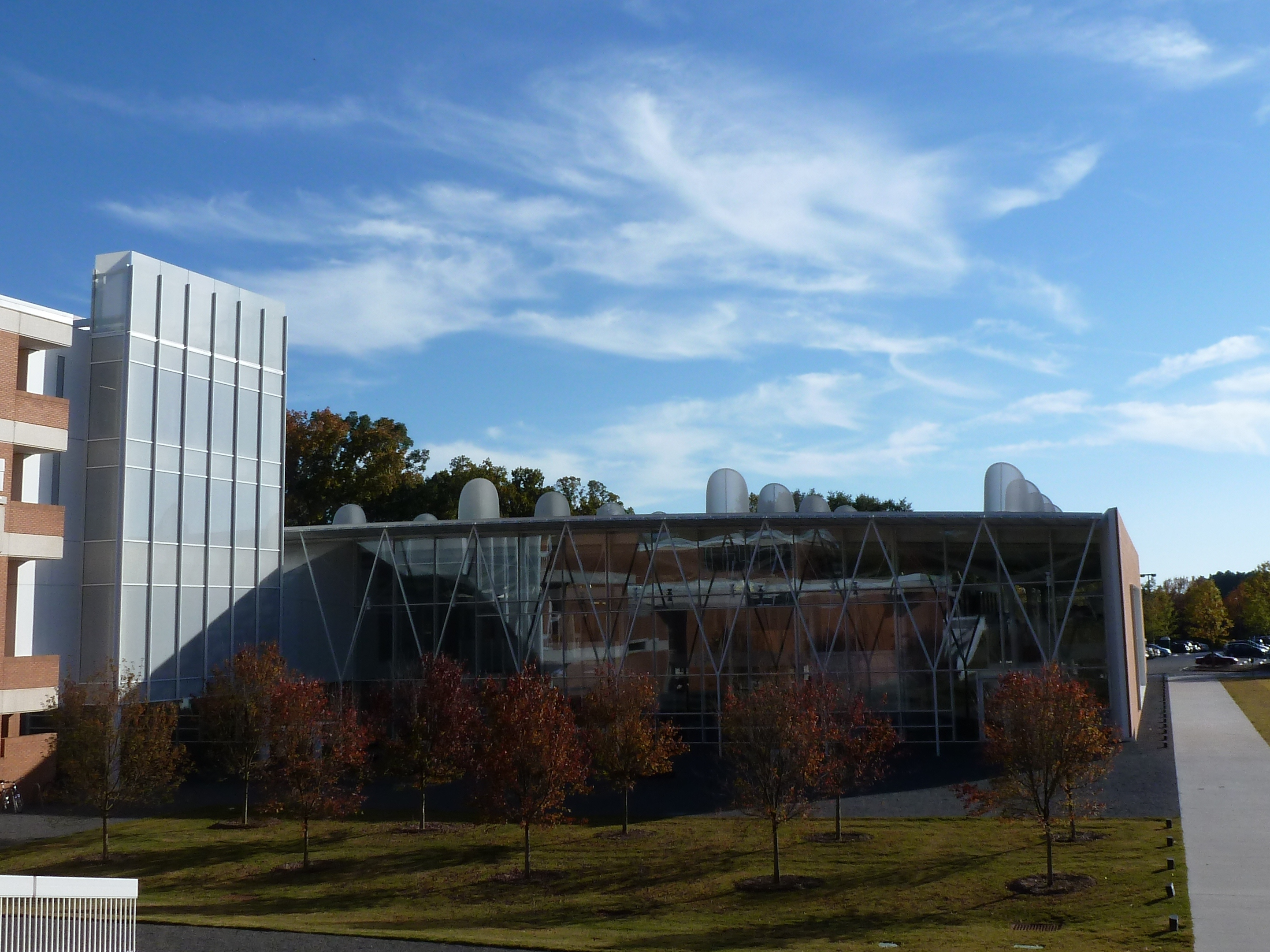
Lee III Hall

The Lee III Hall located on the Clemson University Campus in Clemson, SC, generates enough energy to offset its energy use. Its sustainability puts it on the list of one of the most-energy-efficient academic buildings in the United States. The Lee III Hall is considered to be zero net-energy ready. Its design and materials make it eco-friendly and allow it to eliminate its energy consumption with its own renewable energy. Also, the building contains a 30,000 square-foot garden-roof, the largest university garden-roof in the southeastern United States. Lee III was completed and added to the Lee complex in 2012. It is estimated to have a 55,000-square-foot area and a total cost of 31.6 million dollars. Lee III serves for the College of Architecture, Arts and Humanities.

== Address ==
College of Architecture, Arts and Humanities 110 Daniel Dr. Clemson, SC 29631, United States of America

== History ==
The Lee Hall is named after one of the first Clemson graduates, Rudolph E. Lee. He graduated from Clemson in 1896. The original Lee Hall was constructed on the Clemson Campus in 1957-58. The building was designated as the Structural Science Building for the Science Department. The original design of Lee was created by Harlan McClure, an architect and the former dean of Clemson University. The building was later used for the College of Architecture; the classrooms were used as studio spaces. As the university expended and an increasing number of students enrolled in the College of Architecture, the need for space expansion appeared. The resolution for this problem was the addition of the Lee III Hall. The Lee III expansion was designed by Thomas Phifer and McMillan Pazdan Smith Architecture. Even though the addition of Lee III transformed the 55-year-old building, its features were inspired by the original structure and the addition of the 1970s. Lee III was completed in 2012 and a formal completion ceremony was held in the Lee Hall Courtyard on Friday, April 13, 2012 at 11:30 a.m. Lee III houses the School of Architecture, Planning, Development, Preservation and Landscape Architecture, Department of Art, Department of Construction Science and Management, and the Ph.D. in Planning, Design and the Built Environment. Lee III was named the first modern building in South Carolina on the National Register of Historic Buildings. Also, Lee III was submitted for LEED Certification with the United States Green Building Council.

== Planning and Construction ==
The construction was directed by the Holder Construction Company of Atlanta with the partnership of architects Thomas Phifer, McMillan Pazdan Smith Architecture of Greenville and Partners of New York City. The first plans included the idea of a separate addition of the south existing Lee Hall. Thomas Phifer’s main goal was to create a “Light, opened and well ordered structure.” The goal was also to create an eco-friendly space. Therefore, the decision was to utilize recycled materials. To serve its purpose, the architects planned on increasing the overall Lee complex by 50%. The students and faculty collaborated on proposing the designs for studio work stations. Architect Harvey Grantt also contributed to the project by making recommendations towards the layout of the existing structure.

=== About the Architects ===
The architects working on the Lee III project included Thomas Phifer, Partners of New York and McMillan Pazdan Smith Architecture of Greenville. The main architect, Thomas Phifer a native of Columbia, SC is a former graduate of Clemson University with the degree in architecture. Phifer created his own architecture firm called Thomas Phifer and Partners. Currently, Thomas Phifer's offices are located in New York City. For several years, Phifer worked for an architect Richard Meier. As a result, Phifer’s architectural style is influenced by Meier’s work. He has received American Institute of Architects Honor Awards and American Architecture Awards.

== Design ==
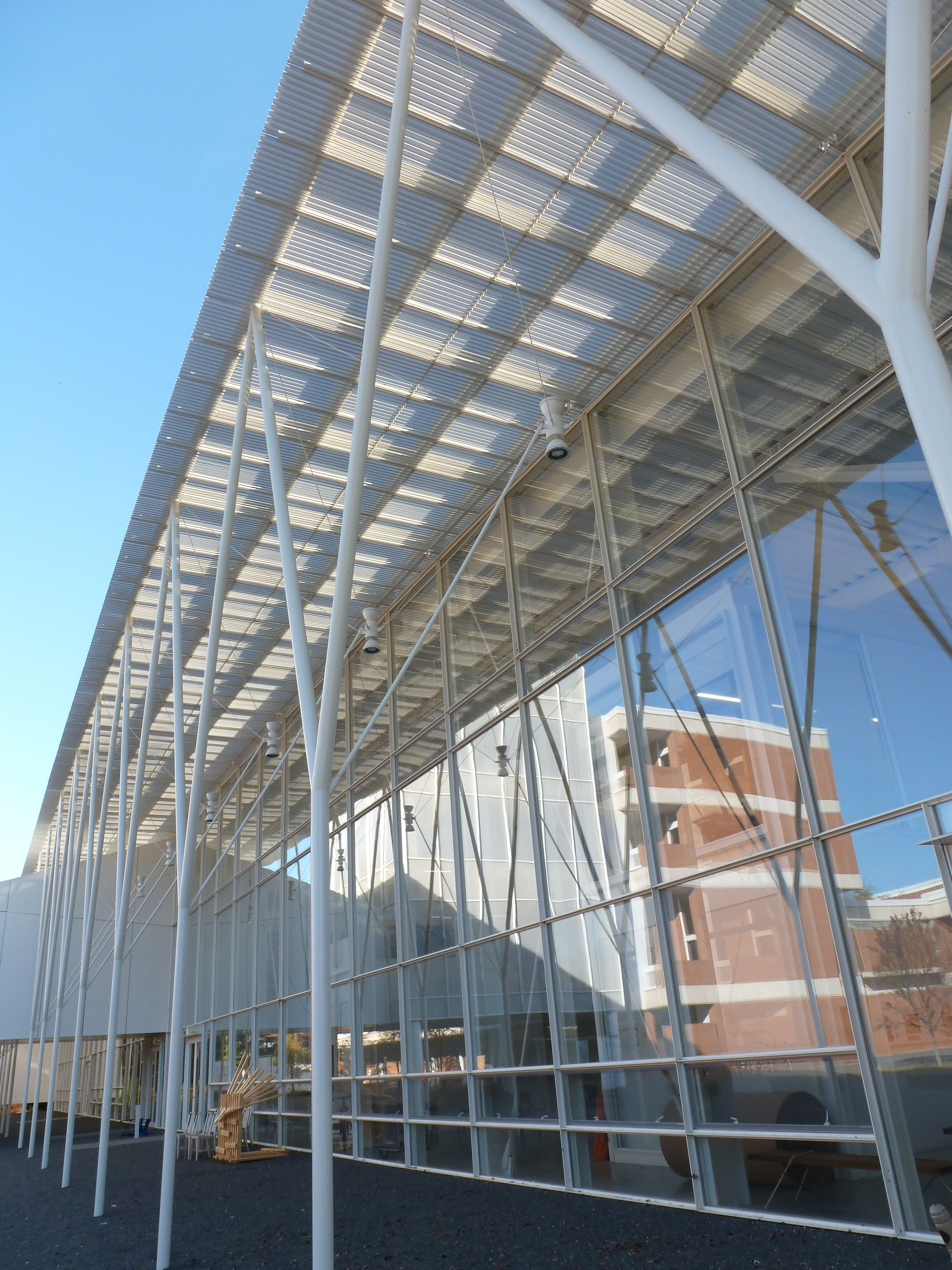
Close-up of the frontal design of the Lee III Hall.

The design of Lee III concentrated on its sustainability. Lee is able to offset its energy use with the energy it generates. This zero-net energy consumption is based on its exterior and interior design as well as its cooling system. Lee III’s heating and cooling system consists of 42 geothermal wells installed below its floors at a depth of 440 feet below the ground. The geothermal wells create its heating a cooling mechanical system. The openness of the building allows for natural ventilation. A system of mechanical windows controls the temperature of the building. When the threshold level is reached by the humidity and temperature, the windows close and stabilize the temperature. The ideal temperature of the building is 59 degrees Fahrenheit. Lee III also contains monitors to stabilize its room temperature. Its Sedum/Garden Roof, the largest in the southeastern US, cools the building by maintaining and controlling the runoff water. The natural light in Lee III comes from the placements and mechanics of the interior and exterior skylights. A total of 53 skylights are installed in the building. This allowed for 98% of its space to have exterior views in different directions. The materials for the building were made close to the construction site, 500 miles or less from the building. All materials used were according to VOC’s standards. The wood used was certified and harvested by the Forestry Stewardship Council.

== Sustainability ==
The Lee III extension is a zero-energy building. Lee III generates as much renewable energy as it uses making it one of the most sustainable buildings in the United States. Its sustainability level is achieved by several factors. On the roof of Lee III, photo-voltaic panels are installed which generate energy from the sun. The design of the large window walls which allow for natural light to enter the building minimizes the need for light during the day. The 42 geothermal walls use the natural temperature of the earth to maintain the temperature inside the building. The building creates natural ventilation through its mechanical windows. The windows are located at the bottom of the building’s base and 30 feet above the floor at the ceiling. Natural ventilation stabilizes the temperature inside and provides for fresh air without using energy. The closed-loop geothermal heat pump offsets the heating and cooling bundle.

== Gallery ==
The following photographs showcase the exterior of the Lee III Hall.

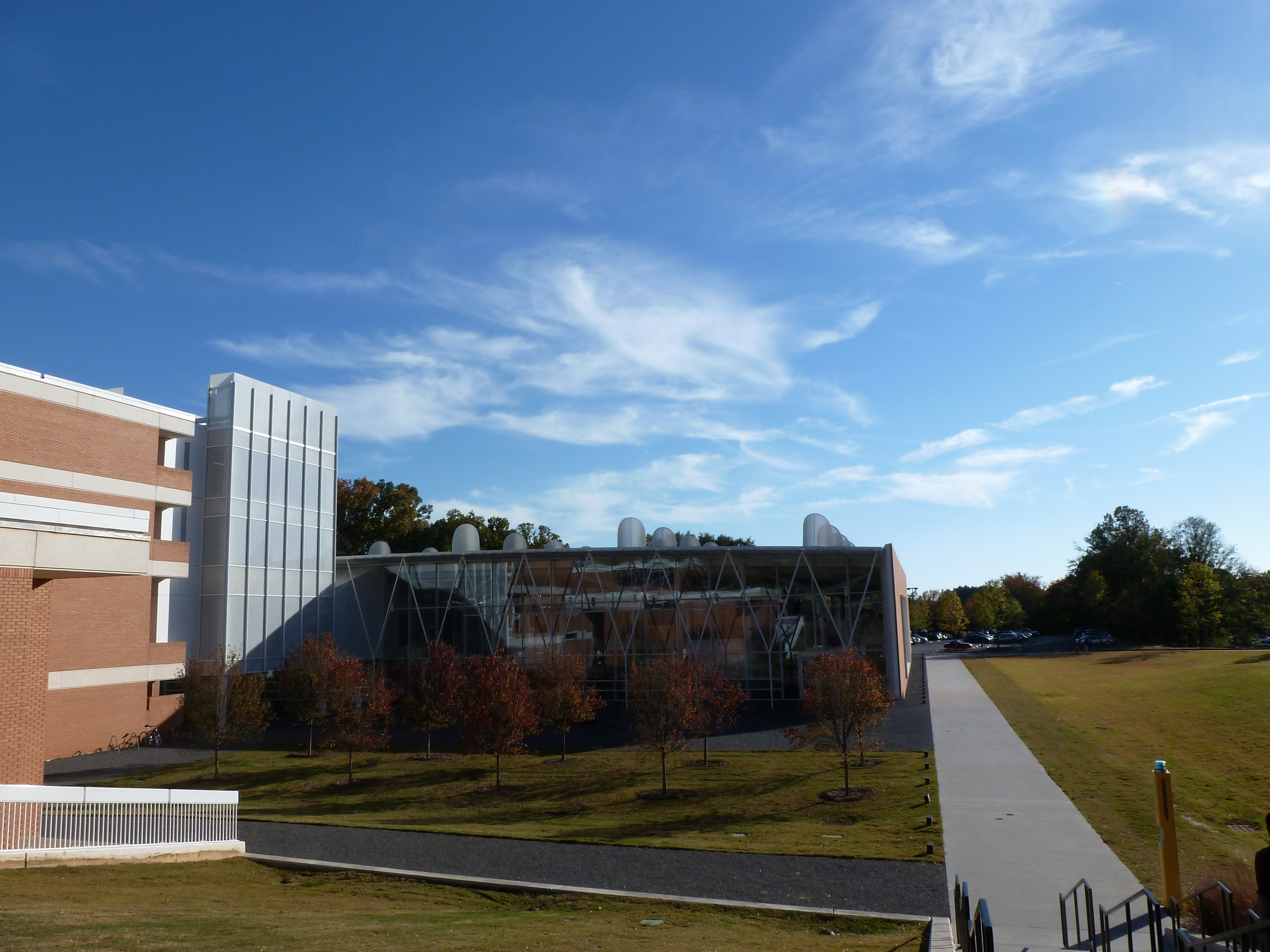
The total view of the Lee III addition.

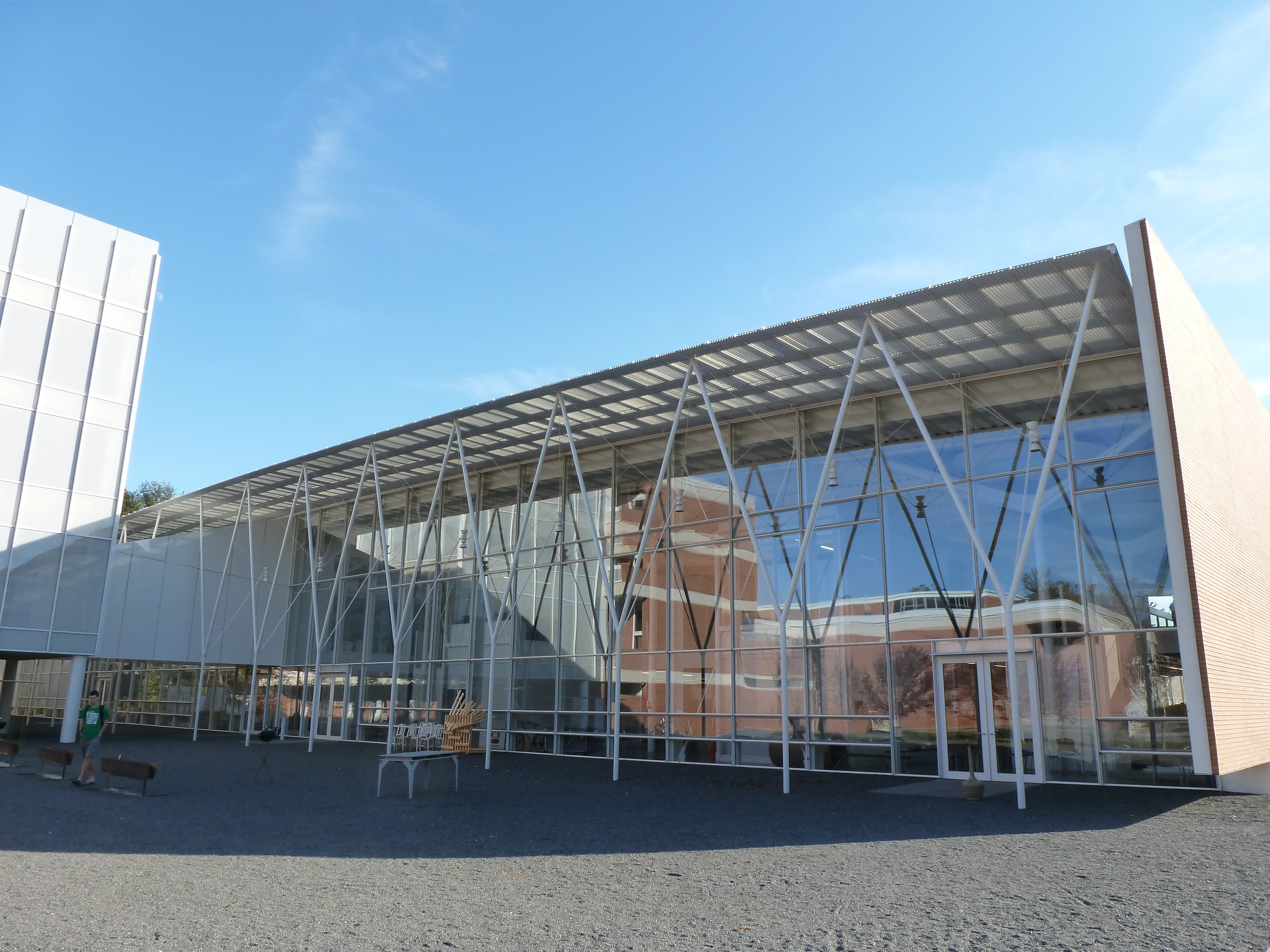
Glass windows of Lee III, Clemson University

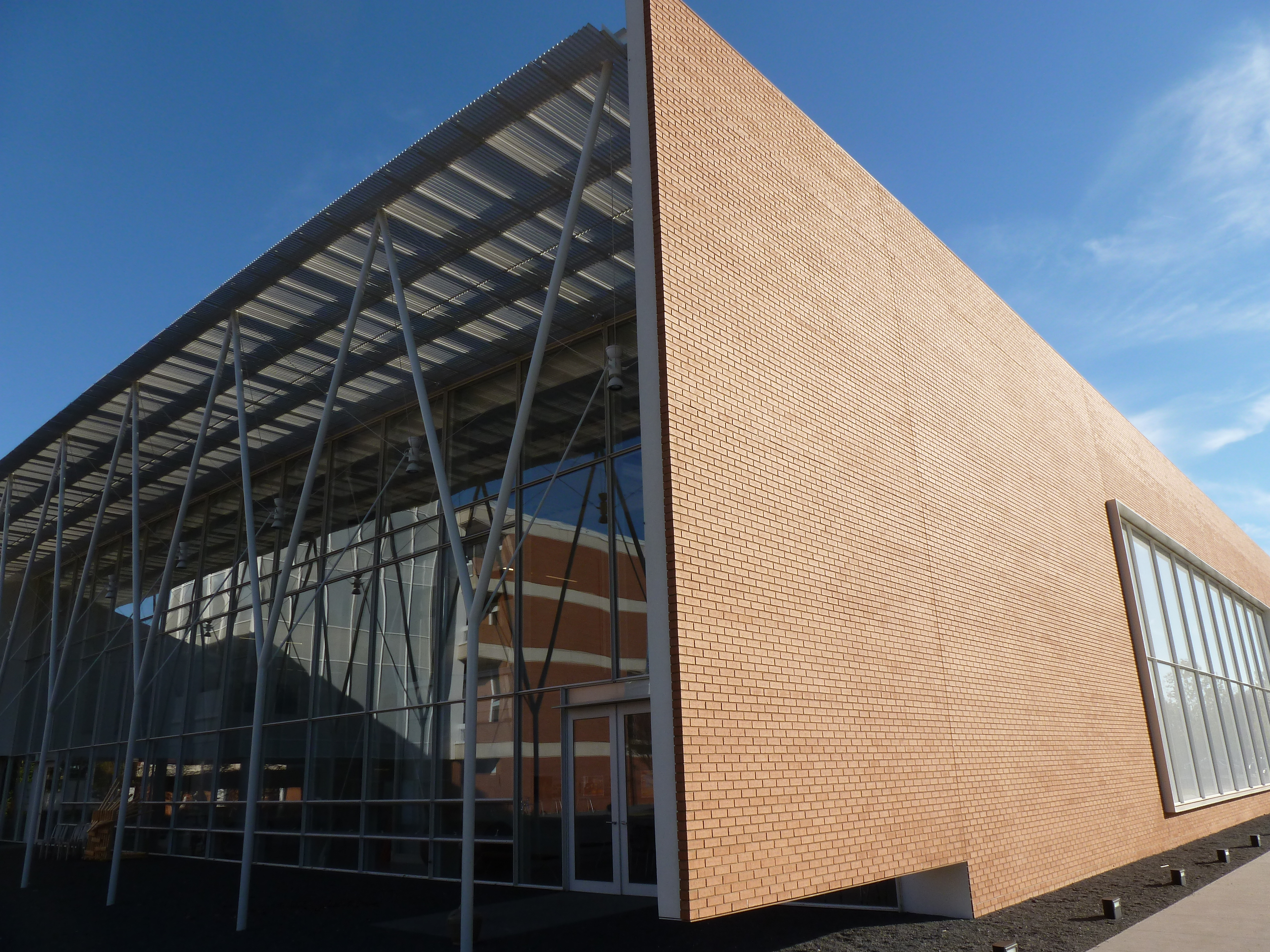
Angle View, Lee III Hall Clemson

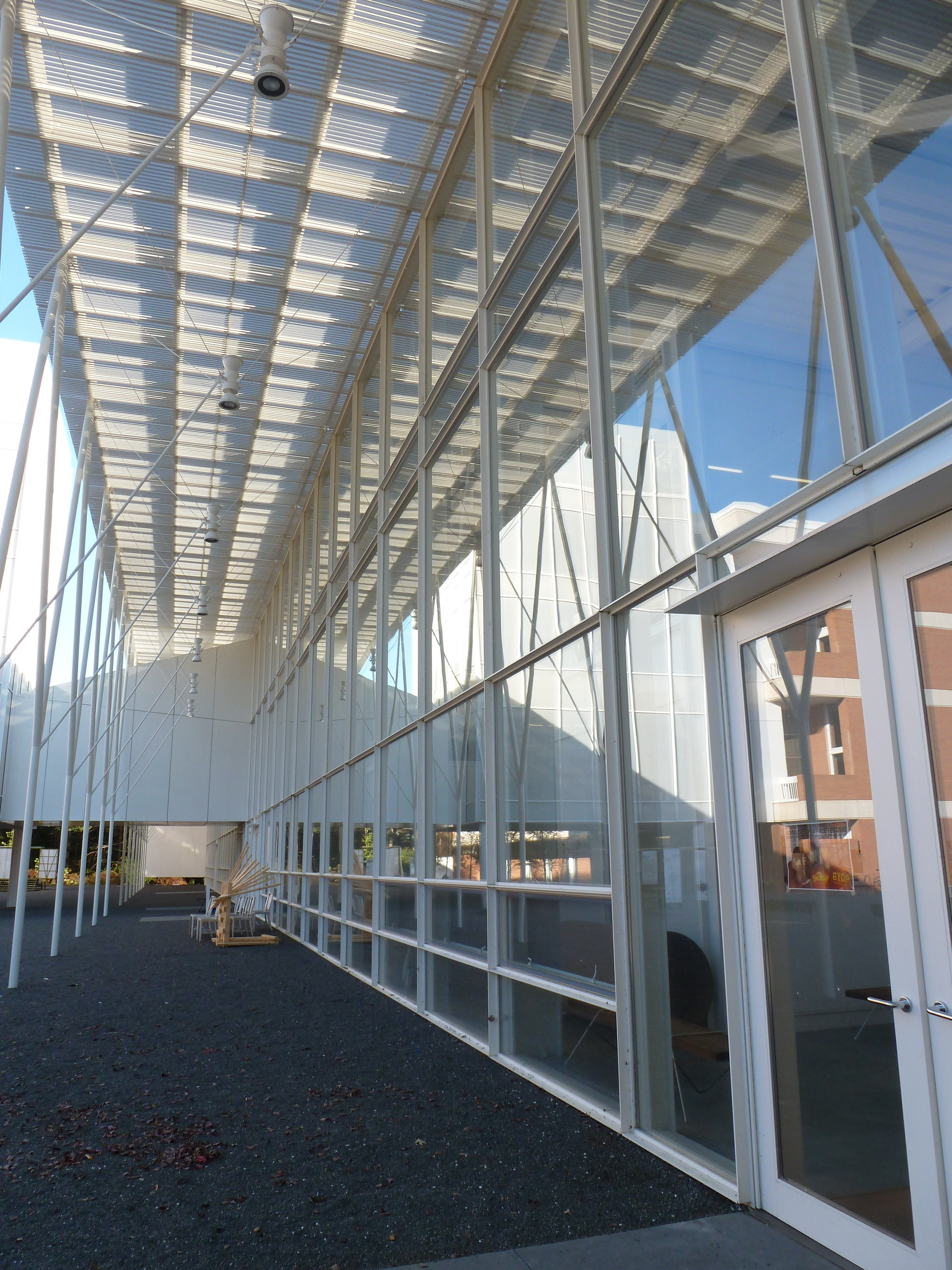
Left View, Lee III Hall, Clemson University, October 22

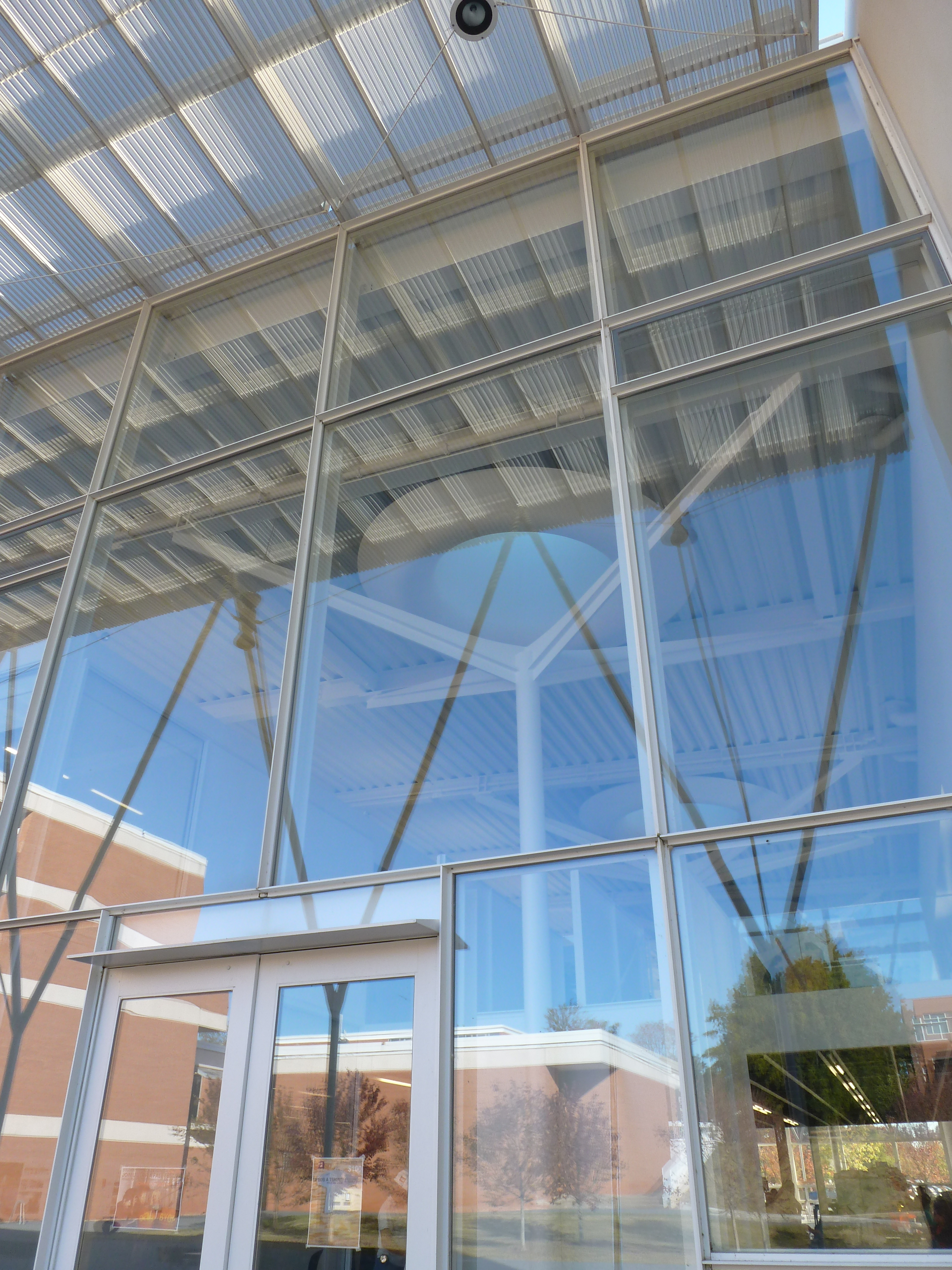
Doors and Skylights, Lee III, Clemson University
