= Glenstone =

Art museum in Potomac, Maryland

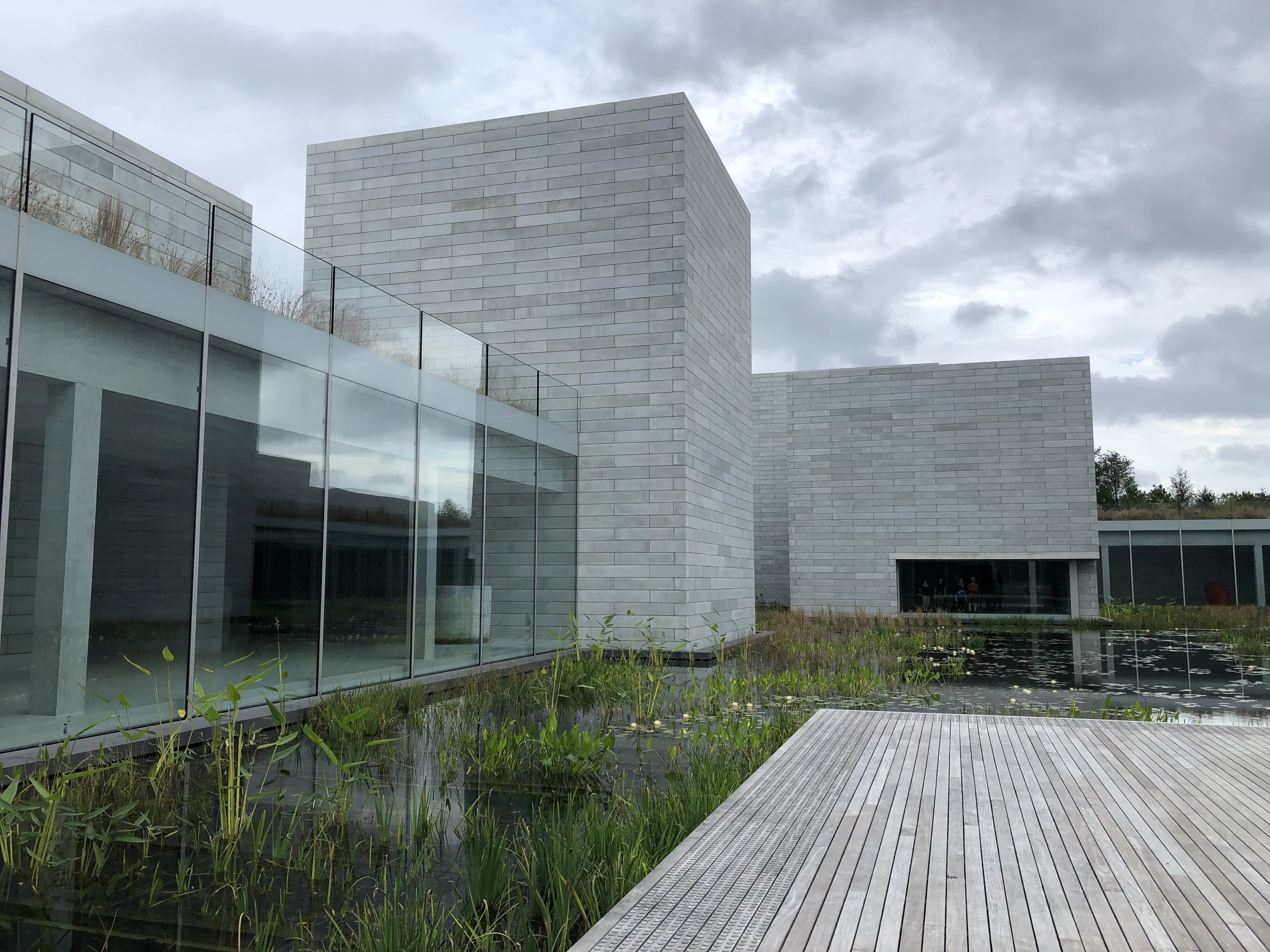
- Pavilions Water Court
- Established: 2006
- Location: Potomac, Maryland, U.S.
- Coordinates: 39.061703°N 77.252595°W
- Type: Art museum
- Collections: Contemporary art
- Collection size: 1,300
- Visitors: 100,000 (2022)
- Founders: Mitchell Rales; Emily Wei Rales
- Director: Emily Wei Rales
- President: Mitchell Rales
- Architects: Charles Gwathmey; Thomas Phifer
- Public transit access: Ride On bus: 301
- Website: glenstone.org

Glenstone is a private contemporary art museum in Potomac, Maryland, founded in 2006 by American billionaire Mitchell Rales and his wife Emily Wei Rales. The museum's exhibitions are drawn from a collection of about 1,300 works from post-World War II artists around the world. It is the largest private contemporary art museum in the United States, holding more than $4.6 billion in net assets, and is noted for its setting in a broad natural landscape.

Glenstone's original building was designed by Charles Gwathmey, with it being expanded several times on its 230-acre (93 ha) campus. Its most significant expansion was finished in the late 2010s, with outdoor sculpture installations, landscaping, a new complex designed by Thomas Phifer, and an environmental center being added. Glenstone has been compared to other private museums, such as the Frick Collection and The Phillips Collection. The museum is free to the public, with over 100,000 visitors in 2022.

== History ==
In 1986, billionaire American businessman Mitchell Rales purchased the property in Potomac, Maryland, to build a home. Starting in 1990, Rales began collecting art for that home. Following a near-death accident on a helicopter trip in Russia, Rales decided to take on a philanthropic project, which became the establishment of a private contemporary art museum. Built on land that was formerly a fox hunting club, Glenstone is named for the nearby Glen Road, and because of stone quarries located in the vicinity. Located 15 miles (24 km) from downtown Washington, D.C., the museum's initial 30,000-square-foot (2,800 m^{2}) Modernist limestone gallery opened in 2006 and admitted visitors two days a week. In its first seven years, the museum admitted only 10,000 visitors.

In 2015, Glenstone was one of several private museums questioned by the US Senate Finance Committee over its nonprofit tax status. After reporting from The New York Times had questioned the validity of nonprofit tax status for institutions like Glenstone, which, at the time, welcomed very few visitors, the committee sought to investigate whether high-value individuals and families were using private museums as a form of tax shelter. Committee Chairman Senator Orrin Hatch said in a letter to Glenstone and other institutions (including the Rubell Museum in Miami and The Broad in Los Angeles) that, "Some private foundations are operating museums that offer minimal benefit to the public while enabling donors to reap substantial tax advantages."

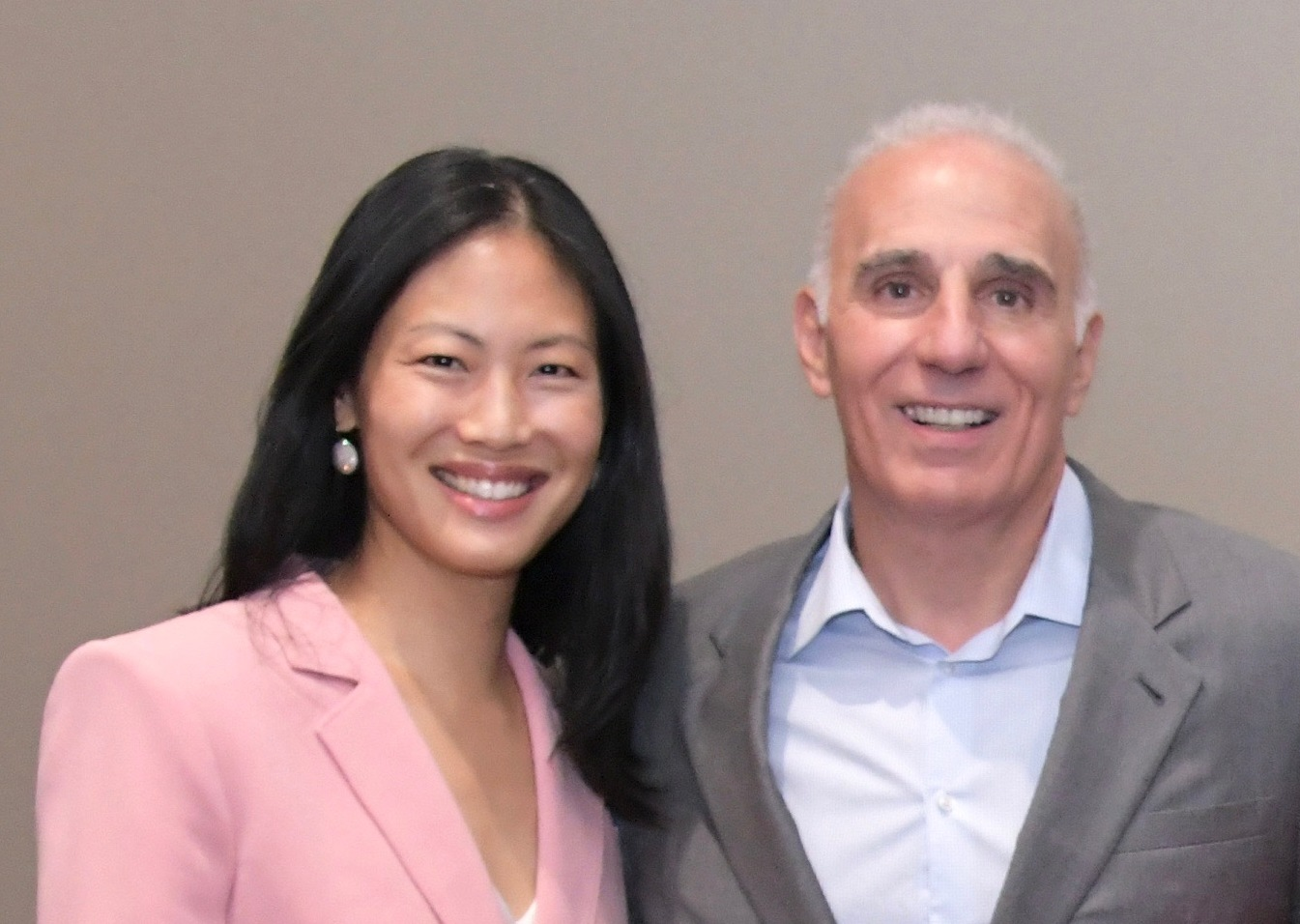
Founders Emily Wei Rales and Mitchell Rales in 2018

Though several smaller expansions took place in the years after the museum's opening, the largest expansion was announced in 2013 and was completed in 2018, opening to the public on October 4, 2018. With a cost of approximately $219 million, the expansion increased the size of the museum's gallery space by a factor of five, increasing the property's size by 130 acres (53 ha), and included substantial landscaping changes. With the expansion, Glenstone became the largest private contemporary art museum in the United States. In 2019, the expansion was named as a "Museum Opening of the Year" by Apollo.

With the expansion, Glenstone opened to the public, with free tickets available online. In the year following the expansion, Glenstone admitted nearly 100,000 visitors.

After 2018, Glenstone continued to acquire adjacent properties, including lots containing residential homes. Speaking on Public Radio Tulsa's Museum Confidential program in 2019, curator Emily Wei Rales said that plans do not include substantial expansion, and will likely be limited to "one or two smaller buildings to house artworks, maybe in the woods, maybe on an adjoining property". She also mentioned potential plans to build a conservation lab on the campus.

To encourage the usage of public transportation, Glenstone successfully lobbied Montgomery County to add a bus stop near its campus. The museum admits visitors without tickets who arrive on public buses.

In August 2018, Glenstone Foundation Inc., the foundation that manages the museum, was sued by HITT Contracting, the company that managed the construction of the 2018 expansion, for $24 million to cover cost overruns. In October 2018, Glenstone countersued HITT Contracting for $35.9 million, claiming that the project was over budget and that construction issues had delayed the expansion's opening. Both parties reached a settlement on undisclosed terms in June 2023.

Rales donated $1.9 billion to the Glenstone Foundation in 2021, made public in 2023, increasing the museum's asset value to $4.6 billion, nearly the same as the Metropolitan Museum of Art in New York.

In July 2021, Glenstone announced a purpose-built expansion to house Richard Serra's large-scale sculpture Four Rounds: Equal Weight, Unequal Measure (2017) that the museum had acquired from the artist. The building, designed by Thomas Phifer, the architect of the Pavilions, was created in consultation with Serra to fit the acquired piece. The expansion opened in 2022. The museum saw over 100,000 visitors in 2022.

The Pavilions were closed from March 2024 to April 2025 in order to replace the architectural glass used in the buildings.

In June 2024, hourly wage museum staff — around half of the museum's workforce — voted to unionize, joining the International Brotherhood of Teamsters Local 639. The Washington Post reported that museum leadership, including Emily Wei Rales, deployed several union busting tactics in the lead-up to the vote, including hiring anti-union consultants.

== Collection and exhibitions ==
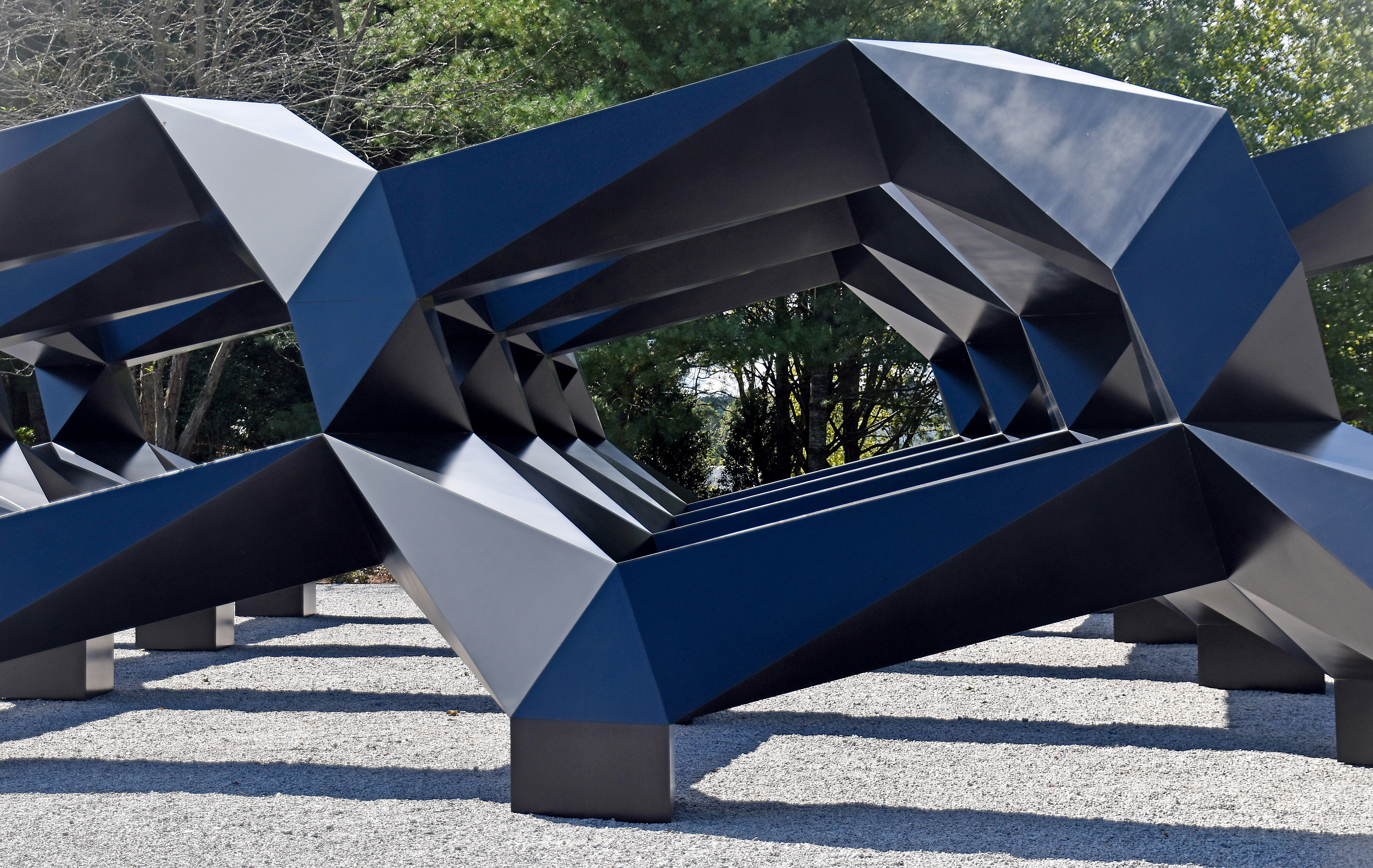
Smug (1973/2005) by Tony Smith.

The museum's collection of about 1,300 post-World War II works from around the world consists of paintings, single-artist installations, video installations, sound installations, and both indoor and outdoor sculptures, totaling $1.4 billion in assets. The collection contains only works by artists who have already exhibited for at least 15 years. As a private art museum, Glenstone has been compared to the Frick Collection and The Phillips Collection.

Many of the museum's large galleries feature only one or two pieces, do not contain explanatory text, and are sparsely furnished. While some exhibitions are permanent, the collection rotates through the galleries over time. Pieces from the collection are also loaned to public institutions.

Glenstone limits entry to about 600 visitors per day, and does not allow children under 12. Rales wrote that she used a formula to calculate the optimal number of visitors for the museum's size, which is used to give visitors time and space to explore and enjoy the museum.

The museum's staff is made up of recent university graduates, including some in postgraduate programs, through its Emerging Professionals Program, a two-year program for aspiring curators. Staff members are stationed in the galleries to answer questions from visitors about the art. Phone and camera use is prohibited in the galleries. In 2018, the introduction of the Pavilions expansion debuted single-artist installations and exhibitions from artists Cy Twombly, Robert Gober, Pipilotti Rist, Charles Ray, On Kawara, Martin Puryear, Michael Heizer, Lygia Pape, and Brice Marden. Other artists who have been on display at Glenstone have included Roni Horn, Alexander Calder, Ruth Asawa, David Hammons, Alighiero Boetti, Kerry James Marshall, Shirin Neshat, Rirkrit Tiravanija, Mark Rothko, Alex Da Corte, and Jenny Holzer.

== Architecture ==
Glenstone is noted for its peaceful natural setting, consisting of a cluster of galleries and other buildings set in a large 230-acre (93 ha) wooded campus. The museum buildings are located toward the center of the campus, and visitors approach the galleries from gravel parking lots via a pathway through the property that is about one-third mile (0.5 km) long. In designing the campus, Glenstone's founders tried to establish a tranquil experience, leading them and art critics to refer to the museum as part of the "slow art" movement.

=== Buildings ===
The original Glenstone building opened in 2006 and was designed by American architect Charles Gwathmey of Gwathmey Siegel & Associates Architects. The building is a 30,000-square-foot (2,800 m^{2}) modernist limestone structure with 9,000 feet (2,700 m) of gallery space, located on 100 acres (40 ha) of land. The 2018 expansion added 50,000 square feet (4,600 m^{2}) of gallery space in a 204,000-square-foot (19,000 m^{2}) museum structure called the Pavilions, designed by American architect Thomas Phifer. Mitchell and Emily Wei Rales have mentioned several buildings as particular influences on the design: the Ryoan-ji Zen temple in Kyoto, Japan; the Menil Collection in Houston, Texas; the Beyeler Foundation in Basel, Switzerland; and the Louisiana Museum of Modern Art in Denmark. The Pavilions is built of 6-foot-long (1.8 m) precast concrete blocks that were poured during different seasons to produce variable coloring. Though it is one building, the Pavilions is meant to appear as multiple separate buildings from a distance. The structure contains eleven galleries connected by glass-enclosed walkways, with windows made of 30-foot (9.1 m) panels of glass. The galleries make heavy use of natural light through clerestories, oculi, and skylights. Regarding the architectural approach to the Pavilions, Emily Rales said, "we knew we wanted these discrete spaces where you could essentially enter into another world that happens to be an art installation".

Glenstone's 2018 expansion was a "critic's choice" in The Wall Street Journal's review of the best architecture of 2018, with Julie V. Iovine writing that Glenstone's architecture takes an approach "that offers a sequence of events revealed gradually with constantly shifting perspectives, as opposed to classic modernism's tightly controlled image of architecture as geometric tableau". In 2020, the expansion was a winner of the American Institute of Architect's Architecture Awards.

In 2019, Glenstone opened a 7,200-square-foot (670 m^{2}) environmental center on its campus. The building contains self-guided exhibits about recycling, composting, and reforestation.

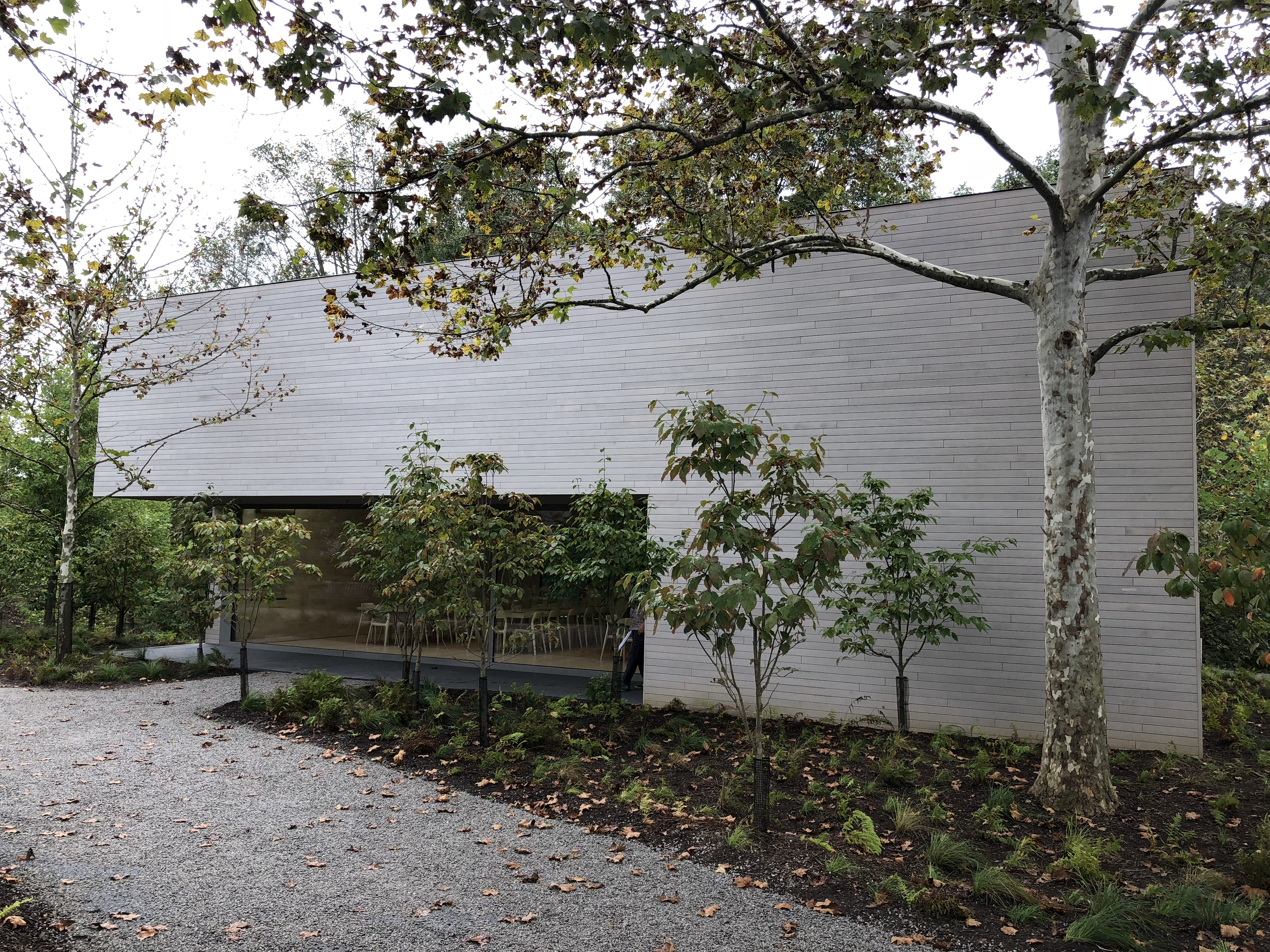
Café

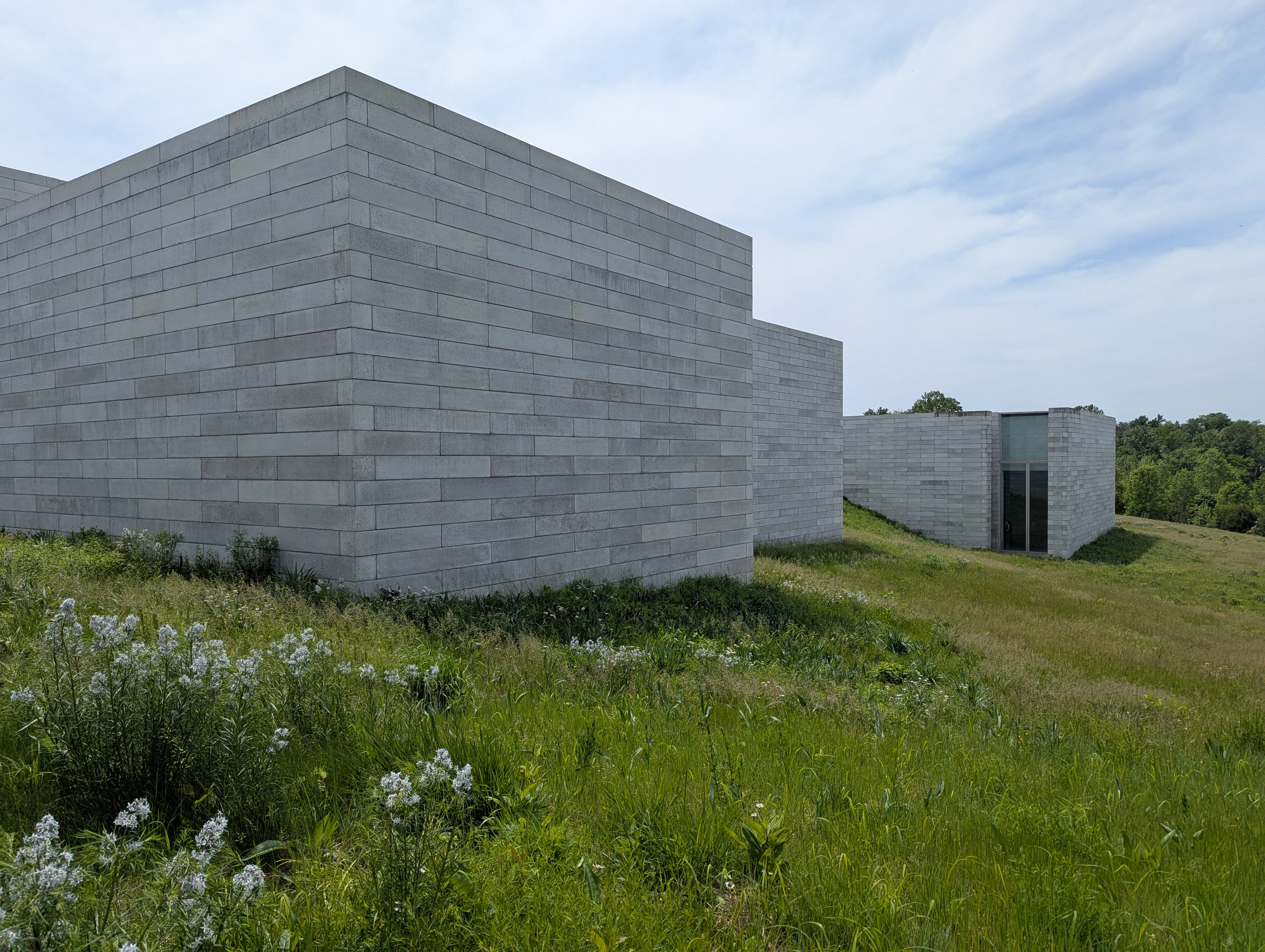
Pavilions exterior

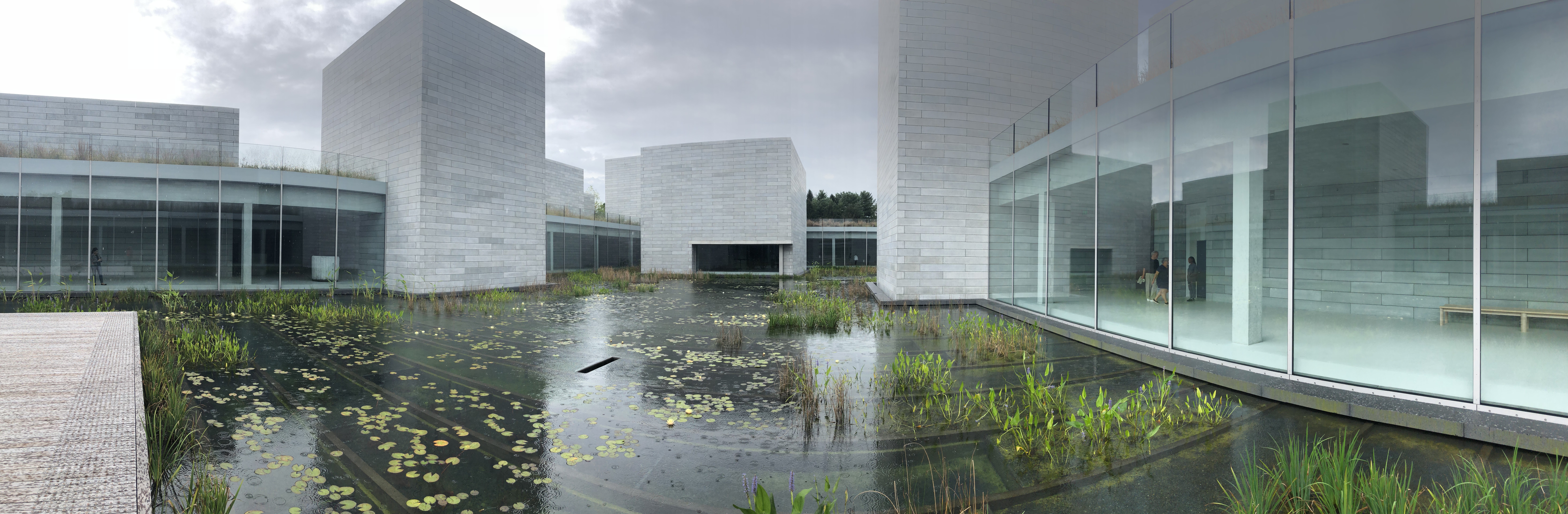
Pavilions interior courtyard
(view as a 360° interactive panorama)

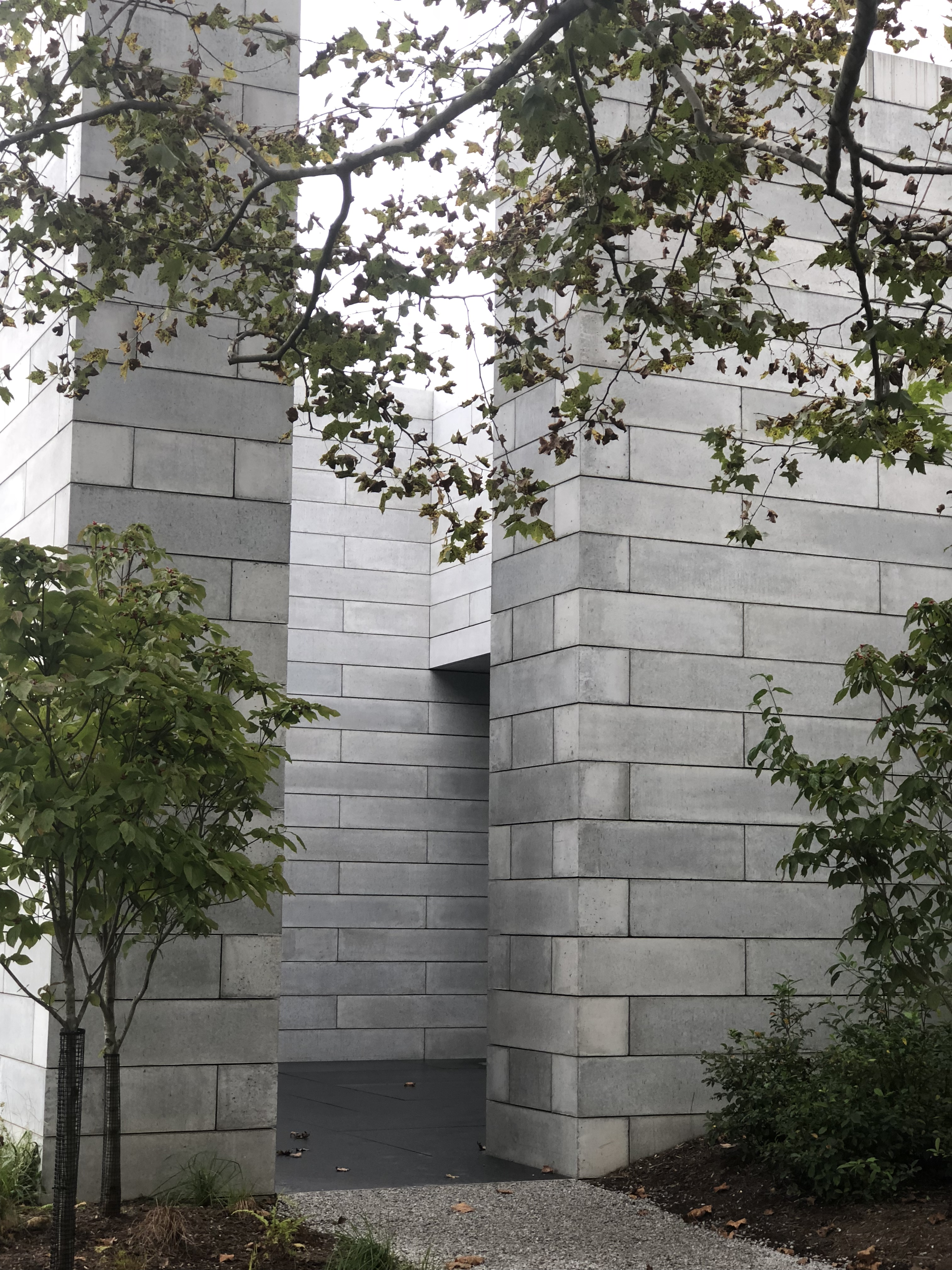
Staff entrance

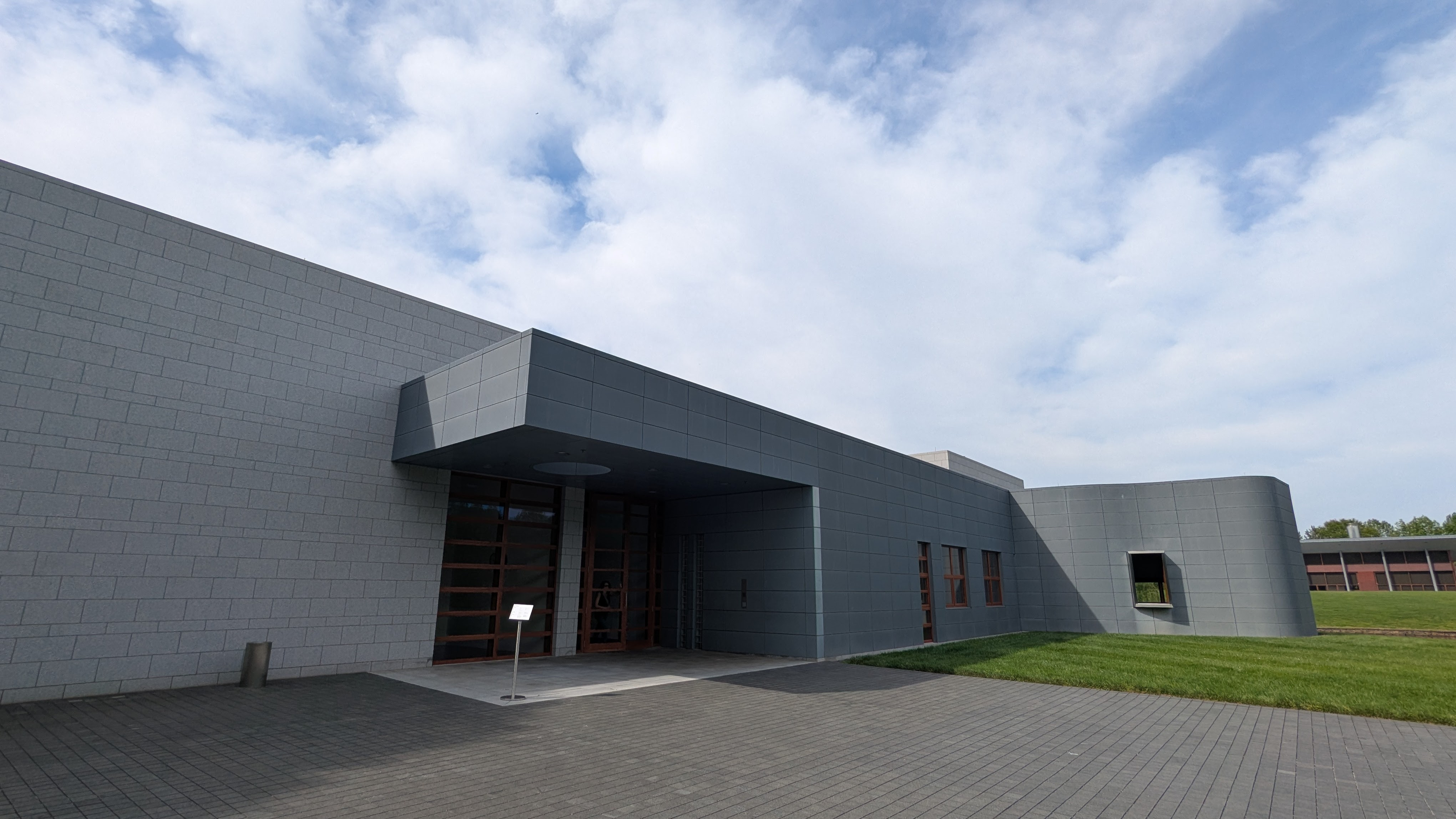
Gallery building

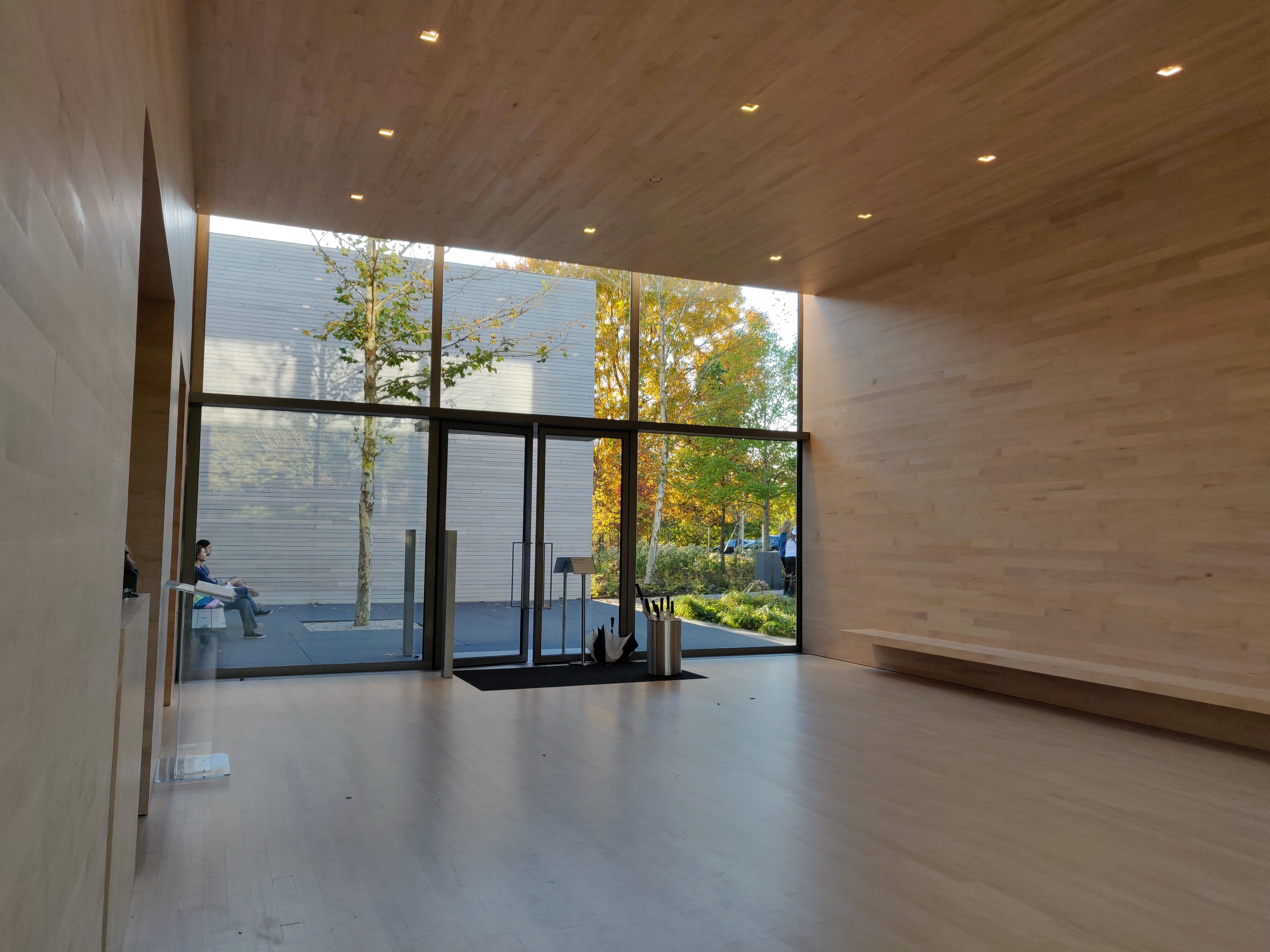
Arrival hall

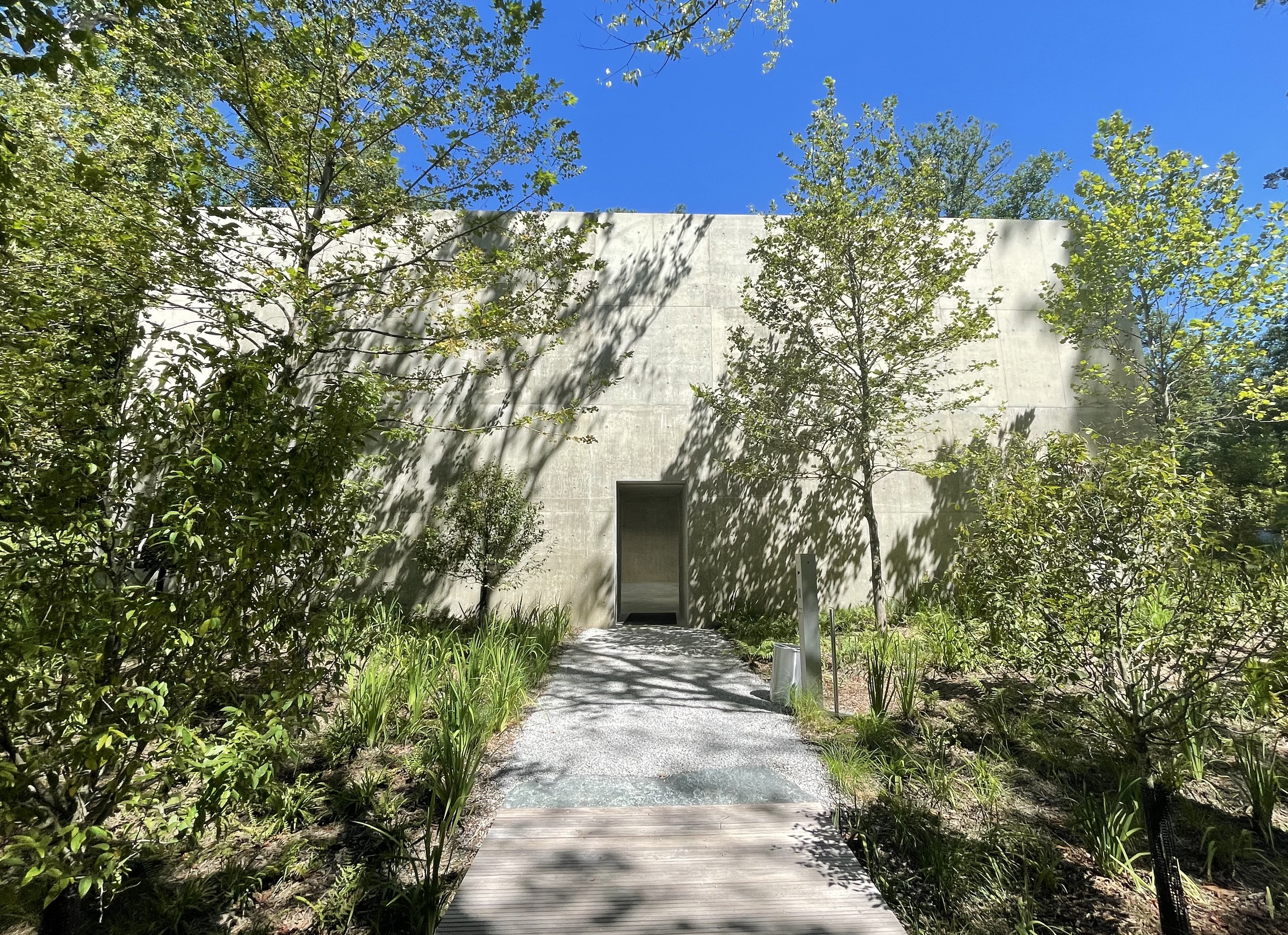
2022 expansion housing a work by Richard Serra

=== Landscape ===
The Pavilions is built around the Water Court, an 18,000-square-foot (1,700 m^{2}) water garden containing thousands of aquatic plants such as waterlilies, irises, thalias, cattails, and rushes. The Water Court's design was inspired by the reflecting pool at the Brion Cemetery in northern Italy. Referring to the way the museum returns visitors to the Water Court, Samuel Medina wrote for Metropolis, "Art isn't the heart of the Glenstone Museum, which opened in October -- water is". Pulitzer Prize-winning critic Sebastian Smee wrote of the Water Court:

It's as if you've entered a beautiful sanctuary, possibly in another hemisphere, maybe another era. Although you've descended, you actually feel a kind of lift, a buoyancy, such as what birds must feel when they catch warm air currents. You exhale. You feel liberated from everyday cares. You're ready for the art.

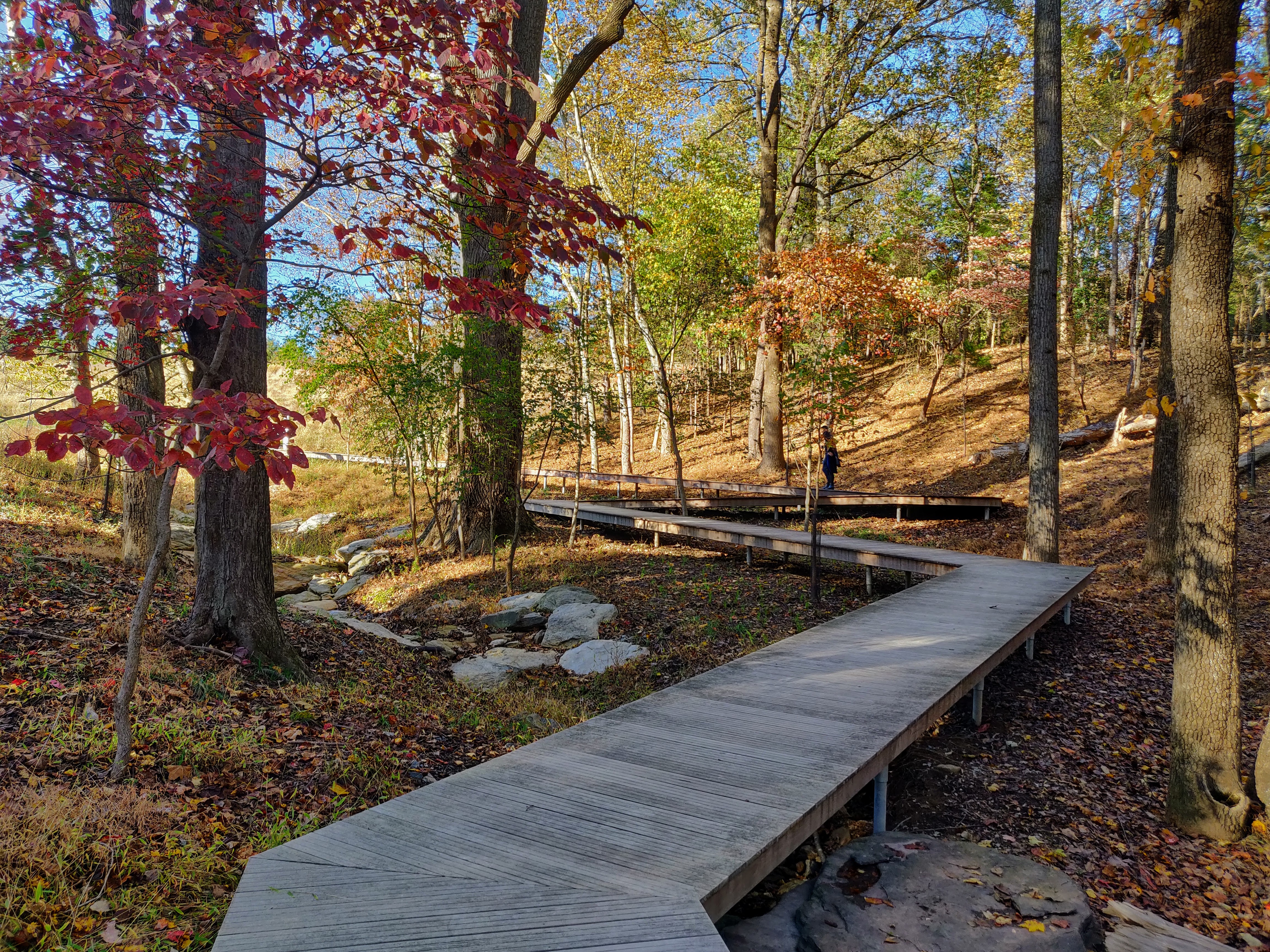
Boardwalk in a wooded area of the campus.

The expansion also added 130 acres (53 ha) of land to the campus, a landscape largely composed of woodland and wildflower meadows. The landscaping was designed by landscape architect Peter Walker's firm PWP Landscape Architecture. The effort included the planting of about 8,000 trees, the transplanting of 200 trees, the converting lawn areas to meadows, and the restoration of streams that flowed through the campus. Glenstone's landscaping is managed using organic products only. This outdoor space hosts large art installations by artists including Jeff Koons, Félix Gonzalez-Torres, Michael Heizer, and Richard Serra.

== Reception ==
In a review for The Washington Post in 2018, Philip Kennicott wrote that Glenstone is a "must-see" museum and that its creators successfully "integrate art, architecture, and landscape". Referring to the natural setting of the museum, he wrote that "everything is quietly spectacular, with curated views to the outdoors that present nature as visual haiku". Kennicott tempered his review by mentioning that the museum's distinctive architecture and layout continually confront visitors with "strange visions" that will make it "interesting to see how it is received".

Kriston Capps of Washington City Paper called Glenstone's 2018 expansion successful and enchanting, with a sublime viewing experience. He wrote that the museum's collection excels in its focus on conventional paintings, sculptures, and installations but excludes more modern media, such as video or performance art. Concerning this conservative focus, Capps wrote, "Glenstone is not promoting equity, addressing inequality, or solving accessibility — not yet anyhow."

In Washingtonian, Dan Reed praised Glenstone's suburban setting, saying it "has little in common with the crowded downtown art meccas" and describing it as soothing, contemplative, and stunningly landscaped.

Writing for the National Review, Brian T. Allen described Glenstone as "a gift to the public of rare size and consequence". He wrote that it "is a huge success on many levels, but among its triumphs is fashioning a mood and space to look intently and even to fall in love with art that most will be disposed to find difficult, forbidding, or inscrutable". Regarding the landscape, Allen wrote, "Getting people out of their cars for the long walk to the exhibition spaces creates a time of orientation and decompression. Few museums can even try this because they don't have the land."

Sebastian Smee wrote in The Washington Post about Glenstone's potential to appeal to some types of visitors but not others. Smee called it "the most exciting new private museum in America", saying that for some visitors, "the Glenstone experience can feel, at least initially, a little weird. A little too...controlling". He said the museum "wants you to have your own experience" and "proposes that art should not be glibly explained away by wall labels but experienced and reflected upon." Also in The Washington Post, Kelsey Ables wrote, "With a vibe somewhere between a luxury spa and a futuristic hospital, Glenstone is soothing to some, dystopian to others..."

Artnet complimented the diversity of Glenstone's exhibited artists, writing that "they have seamlessly integrated into the typically male, overwhelmingly white Modern art canon superb work by women, Asian (particularly Japanese) artists, and Latin American (particularly Brazilian) artists", but also wrote that it "offers comparatively little work by black, Latinx, and Native American artists". The Washington Post's dance critic, Sarah L. Kaufman, wrote that Glenstone exhibits many visual works that are relevant and influential to dance, including works by Pipilotti Rist, Jasper Johns, and Sol LeWitt.
