= 222 Second Street =

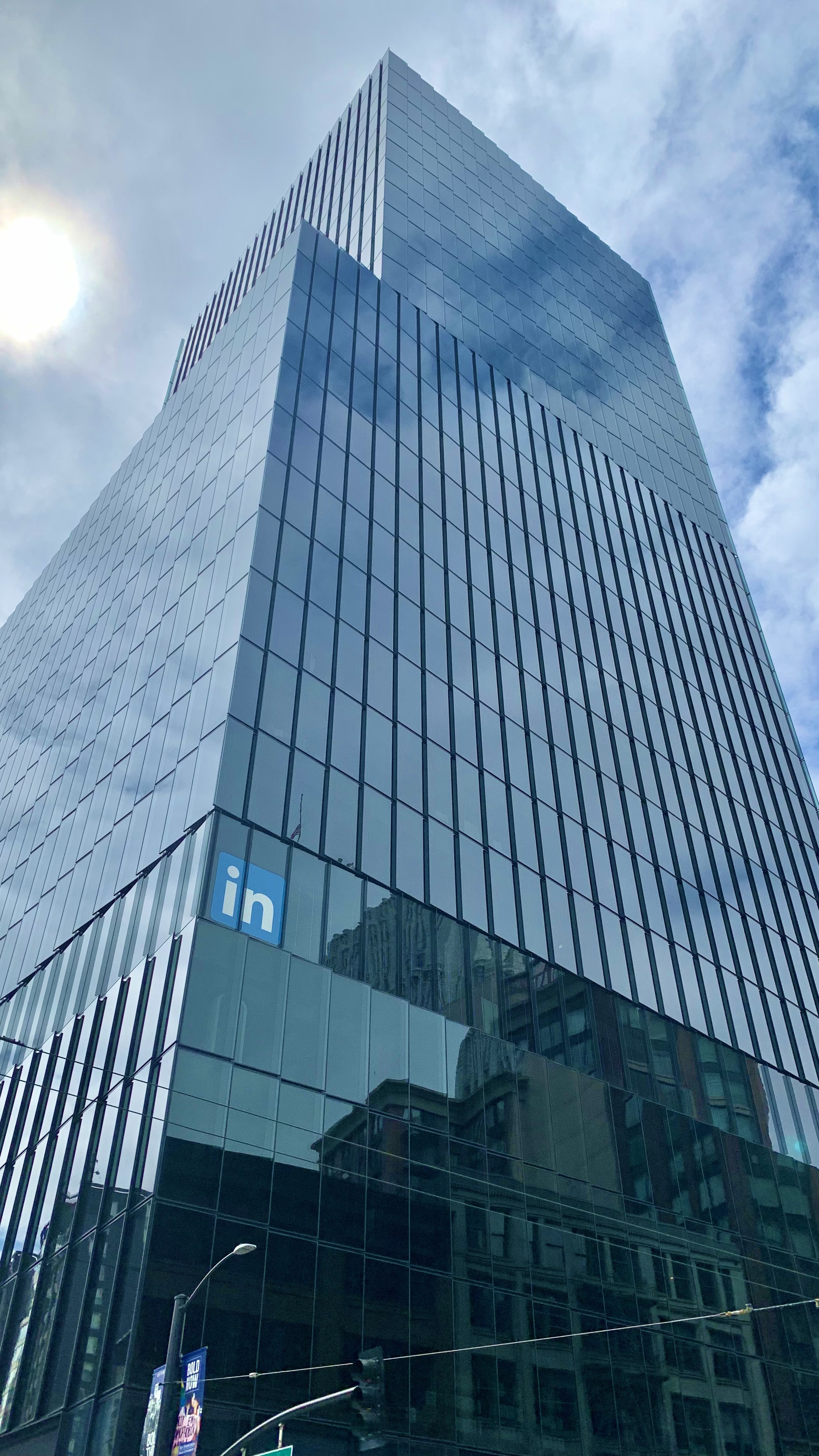
- In April 2021

- Location within San Francisco 222 Second Street (California) 222 Second Street (the United States)

General information
- Status: Completed
- Type: Commercial offices
- Architectural style: Modernism
- Location: 222 Second Street; San Francisco, California
- Coordinates: 37.78635°N 122.39825°W
- Construction started: 2013
- Completed: 2016

Height
- Architectural: 370 ft (110 m)
- Roof: 350 ft (110 m)

Technical details
- Floor count: 26
- Floor area: 452,418 ft^{2} (42,031.0 m^{2})
- Lifts/elevators: 10

Design and construction
- Architects: Gensler; Thomas Phifer and Partners
- Developer: Tishman Speyer
- Structural engineer: Louie International
- Other designers: Arup Group Limited
- Main contractor: Turner Construction

Other information
- Parking: 73 car 23 bicycle

222 Second Street is a 370-foot (110 m) office skyscraper in the South of Market District of San Francisco, California. It is under lease by social networking company LinkedIn (headquartered in nearby Sunnyvale).

Developed by Tishman Speyer and designed by Thomas Phifer, the high rise was planned to provide 450,209 square feet (41,825.8 m^{2}) of office space, 2,209 square feet (205.2 m^{2}) of ground floor retail, and 8,600 square feet (800 m^{2}) of open space accessible to the public, at the southern corner of Second and Howard Streets. Construction began in August 2013, still without a tenant on hand.

In April 2014, LinkedIn announced it was leasing the building for an undisclosed sum, to accommodate up to 2,500 of its employees, with the lease covering 10 years. The goal was to join all of its San Francisco based staff (1,250 as of January 2016) in one building, bring sales and marketing employees together with the research and development team.

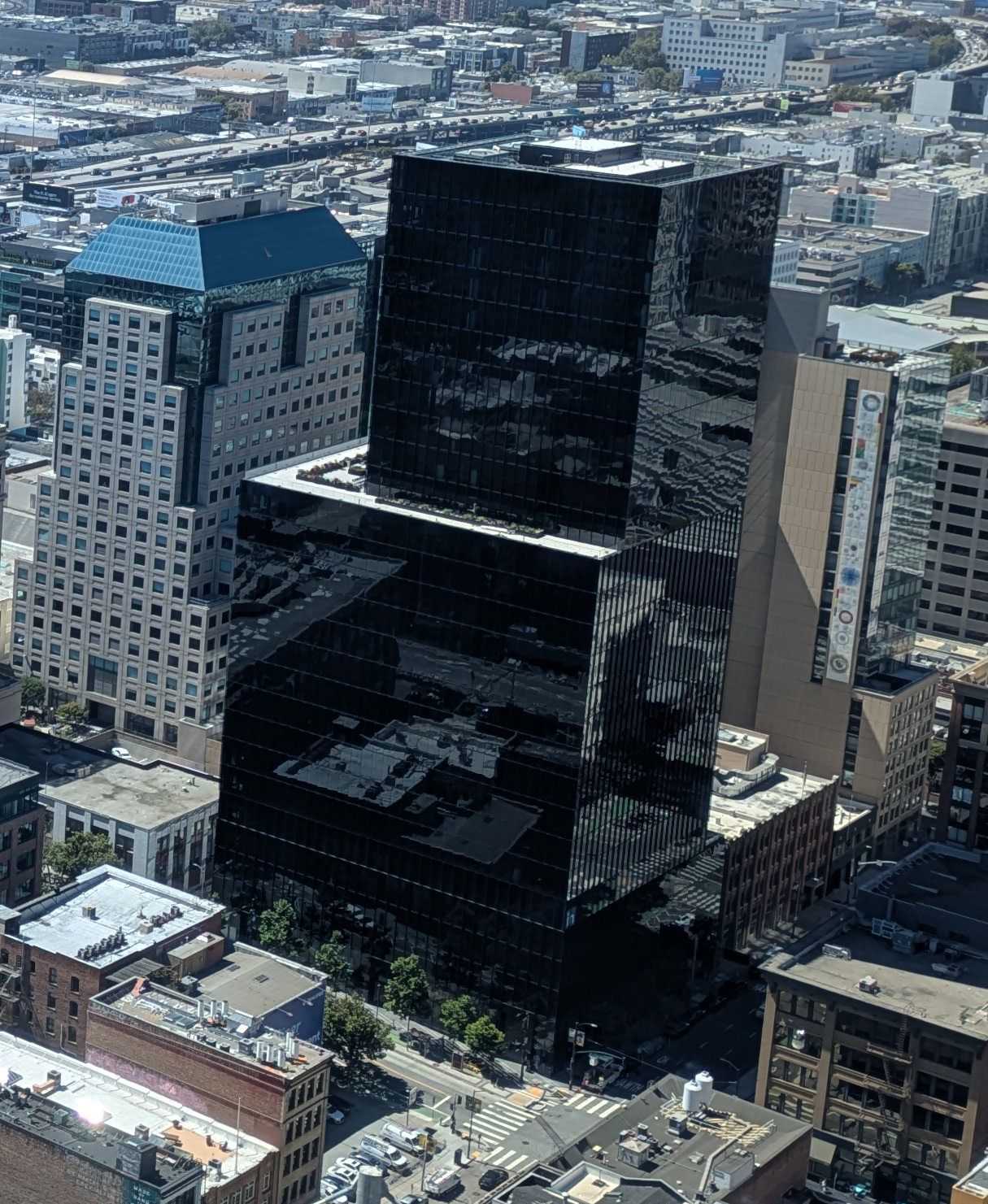
222 Second Street seen from Salesforce Tower

The building was topped-out in August 2014 and opened in March 2016, with LinkedIn staff moving in in stages until 2017. As of mid-2022, LinkedIn was still leasing the building's entire 450,000 square feet, notwithstanding a rise in remote work during the COVID-19 pandemic.

The ground floor is open to the public during work hours, as a privately owned public space. It features three large artworks by Frank Stella, in accordance with the developers' public art proposal to the city Planning Commission, with the purchase price of $1 million matching 1% of the total "construction hard costs".

The San Francisco Chronicle's architecture critic John King characterized the building as "severe yet sleek" and expressed appreciation for the arrangement of the "panes of overlapping glass 6 feet wide and 13 feet high [that] cover a form that begins as a squat 16-story rectangle and concludes as a 10-story square. On the lower four stories the shingled pattern fans to the right; the fifth floor panels are flat, side by side, and then the shingles resume in reverse, flipping tightly to the left. The upper floors reverse the pattern yet again." However, while acknowledging their appeal in certain light situations ("a large-scale shuffle of vivid reflections"), King criticized their dark color (evoking a "dull gloom" on cloudy days). And he chastised the building - "designed and built by New Yorkers" - as being aesthetically out of place on Second Street, "an alien presence in a well-established setting where other recent buildings have done their best to add to the ambiance".

As of May 2023, in contrast to what the San Francisco Chronicle described as "Downtown San Francisco['s] worst office vacancy crisis on record" at the time, 222 Second Street retained a 0% vacancy rate.

== See also ==
- San Francisco's tallest buildings
