= Foundation for Contemporary Arts =

Non-profit organization in the USA

The Foundation for Contemporary Arts (FCA), is a nonprofit based foundation in New York City that offers financial support and recognition to contemporary performing and visual artists through awards for artistic innovation and potential. It was established in 1963 as the Foundation for Contemporary Performance Arts by artists Jasper Johns, John Cage, and others.

FCA was founded on the principle of "Artists for Artists" support as visual artists united to sponsor performance artists through grants funded by the sale of donated artworks. The first benefit exhibition was at the Allan Stone Gallery in 1963. Among contributors to the Foundation's first benefit exhibition were Marcel Duchamp, Ellsworth Kelly, Willem de Kooning, Elaine de Kooning, Roy Lichtenstein, Robert Motherwell, Barnett Newman, Robert Rauschenberg, Claes Oldenburg, and Andy Warhol.

Since its establishment, FCA has awarded more than 2,500 non-restrictive grants to individual artists and art organizations through its seven grant programs: Grants to Artists, Emergency Grants, the biennial John Cage Award, the biennial Merce Cunningham Award, the annual Robert Rauschenberg Award, the annual Ellsworth Kelly Award, and the annual Dorothea Tanning Award.

FCA is located at 820 Greenwich Street in the West Village neighborhood of New York City.

== History ==
In late 1962, John Cage, Jasper Johns, and Robert Rauschenberg wanted to help Merce Cunningham Dance Company finance a season on Broadway. Each donated an artwork to be sold to cover the loss that would be incurred but realized that the sales might generate a bit more than would be needed. Asked what should happen to the excess, Cunningham remarked that other performers "are in the same boat" and should be helped. Cage and Johns expanded the idea by establishing the Foundation for Contemporary Performance Arts. They invited other artists to contribute works to an exhibition at the Allan Stone Gallery, which opened February 25, 1963 — and firmly established the Foundation's roots in the community of artists. Lee Bontecou, Elaine de Kooning, Willem de Kooning, Marcel Duchamp, Alex Katz, Ellsworth Kelly, Roy Lichtenstein, Marisol, Barnett Newman, Claes Oldenburg, Robert Rauschenberg, James Rosenquist, Frank Stella, Elaine Sturtevant, and Andy Warhol were among the sixty-seven artists who contributed to this landmark show. With proceeds from the exhibition, the Foundation began making grants to individual artists.

During its first year, FCA made grants to composers Earle Brown and Morton Feldman and underwrote a concert of their music presented at Town Hall in New York. Additional grants went to Judson Memorial Church, the Paper Bag Players, choreographers Trisha Brown, Lucinda Childs, Meredith Monk, Yvonne Rainer, and Twyla Tharp; and composers Philip Glass, Steve Reich, and La Monte Young.

As of 2020, the directors of the FCA include Cecily Brown, Anne Collier, Anthony B. Creamer III, Anne Dias, Jasper Johns, Jennie C. Jones, Julian Lethbridge, Dean Moss, Emily Wei Rales, and James Welling.

== Grant programs ==
=== Grants to Artists ===
Grants to Artists are unrestricted, annual $40,000 awards made to provide recipients with the financial means to engage in their choice of artistic endeavors. Recipients are selected from confidential nominations. FCA invites dozens of artists and arts professionals to anonymously propose one exceptional individual, collective, or performing group. Then, FCA’s Directors, together with an advisor in each discipline, select grantees based on the merit and imaginativeness of their work and the impact such support might have at this point in their careers.

=== Emergency Grants ===
Emergency Grants are awarded on an ongoing basis to emerging artists and collectives throughout the United States who are in need of timely, urgent support. Emergency Grants provides quick, grassroots support to artists who have unexpected expenses when projects are close to completion or sudden opportunities to present work to the public. Requests are reviewed monthly by a volunteer panel of established artists. Emergency Grants typically ranging from $500 to $2,500.

=== John Cage Award ===
The John Cage Award is a biennial $45,000 grant made in recognition of outstanding achievements in contemporary arts. It was established in 1992 in memory of the late composer, one of FCA’s founders.

=== Merce Cunningham Award ===
The Merce Cunningham Award is a biennial grant made in recognition of outstanding achievement in the arts that reflects the creativity and spirit of choreographer, Merce Cunningham, an artist involved in the founding of FCA. It was established in 2015 with an endowment gift from the Merce Cunningham Trust.

=== Robert Rauschenberg Award ===
The Robert Rauschenberg Award is an annual $45,000 grant made to a visual or performing artist in honor of Rauschenberg's legacy of innovation, risk-taking, and experimentation. It was established in 2013 with a $720,000 gift from the Robert Rauschenberg Foundation.

=== Ellsworth Kelly Award ===
The Ellsworth Kelly Award is an annual $45,000 grant made to support a solo exhibition by an emerging, mid-career or little-known contemporary visual artist at a regional art museum, or university or college art gallery in the United States. It was established in 2016 with a $1 Million gift from the Ellsworth Kelly Foundation.

=== Dorothea Tanning Award ===
The Dorothea Tanning Award is an annual $45,000 grant made in celebration of Tanning's fierce independence and limitless imagination. It was established in 2016 with a $1 million endowment gift from the Destina Foundation.
