= List of Swedish inventors =

Swedish inventors are Swedish people who invented novel ideas, machines or tools.

In the 18th century, Sweden's Scientific Revolution took off. Previously, technical progress had mainly come from professionals who had emigrated from mainland Europe. In 1739, the Royal Swedish Academy of Sciences was founded, with people such as Carl Linnaeus and Anders Celsius as early members.

Sweden had a total of 49,974 patents as of 2015 according to the United States Patent and Trademark Office, and only ten other countries had more patents than Sweden.

The traditional engineering industry is still a major source of Swedish inventions, but pharmaceuticals, electronics and other high-tech industries are gaining ground. A large portion of the Swedish economy is to this day based on the export of technical inventions, and many large multinational corporations from Sweden have their origins in the ingenuity of Swedish inventors.

== 17th century ==
- Christopher Polhem (1661–1751) was a Swedish scientist, inventor and industrialist. He made significant contributions to the economic and industrial development of Sweden, particularly mining. He reinvented the Cardan joint under the name of "Polhem knot" (Polhemknut) independently of Gerolamo Cardano, an Italian mathematician who invented the knot in 1545. His greatest achievement was an automated factory powered entirely by water; automation was very unusual at the time.
- The Stockholms Banco became the first European bank to print banknotes (credit creation) from 1661 onwards, founded by Johan Palmstruch. It engaged in lending as well as commercial payments which set it aside from the earlier innovations of the Amsterdam-based Wisselbank. This made Sweden one of the innovators of 17th century finance along with the Dutch Empire and the British Empire (once the Bank of England had been founded some years later in 1694).

== 18th century ==
- Anders Celsius (1701–44) was an astronomer and mathematician most famous for inventing the 100-point thermometer scale, widely used across the world.
- Sven Åderman is a Swedish inventor who created a musket capable of firing more rapidly than conventional weaponry of the late 18th century. This new musket was first used in the wars of King Karl XII. For his efforts King Frederick I of Sweden bestowed upon him the estate of Halltorps in the year 1723.
- Jonas Lidströmer (1755–1808), was a Swedish inventor and officer in the Royal Swedish navy. He is behind a large number of mechanical devices and innovations, such as steel grinderies, ship docks, compasses etc.
- Johan Patrik Ljungström (1784–1859), jeweler, inventor in gas lighting, and underwater diving pioneer
- Per Georg Scheutz (1785–1873) was a 19th-century Swedish lawyer, translator, and inventor, who is best known for his pioneering work in computer technology. The best known of his inventions is the Scheutzian calculation engine, invented in 1837 and finalized in 1843.
- Gustaf Erik Pasch (1788–1862) invented the safety match.
- Martin von Wahrendorff (1789–1861) was a Swedish diplomat and inventor. In 1837 Wahrendorff applied for patent on a new breech calculating, later known as the Wahrendorff breech. The first breech loaded Wahrendorff gun was manufactured at Åker in 1840.

== 19th century ==
From the 1870s, engineering companies were created at an unmatched rate and engineers became considered heroes of the age. Many of the companies founded by early pioneers are still internationally familiar.

- Jonas Offrell (1803–1863) was a Swedish priest who developed a revolver at the same time and independently of Samuel Colt.
- Martin Wiberg (1826–1905) is known as a computer pioneer for his 1875 invention of a machine the size of a sewing machine that could print logarithmic tables. Apart from this invention, Wiberg invented numerous other devices and gadgets, among these a cream separator and a pulse jet engine.
- Alfred Nobel (1833–1896) invented dynamite and instituted the Nobel Prizes.
- Helge Palmcrantz (1842–1880), Swedish inventor and industrialist. In 1873 Palmcrantz patented the multi-barrel, lever-actuated, machine gun that later would be known as the Nordenfelt machine gun.
- Willgodt Theophil Odhner (1845–1905) was a Swedish mechanic and inventor of the Odhner arithmometer, a mechanical calculator.
- Lars Magnus Ericsson (1846–1926) started the company bearing his name, Ericsson, still one of the largest telecom companies in the world.
- Jonas Wenström was an early pioneer in alternating current and is, along with Nikola Tesla, credited as one of the inventors of the three-phase electrical system.
- Johan Petter Johansson (1853–1943) built and patented the adjustable spanner/wrench in 1892.
- Gustaf de Laval (1845–1913) was a Swedish engineer and inventor who made important contributions to the design of steam turbines and dairy machinery. The most famous invention was the milk-cream separator. In 1883 he and others founded AB Separator (later Alfa Laval). He obtained over one hundred patents in total.
- Carl Rickard Nyberg (1858–1939), inventor of the blowtorch. After Primus started producing blowtorches he also decided to make paraffin oil/kerosene cookers. The first model, called Viktoria, wasn't very successful, but the later Svea did better. Nyberg also worked on many other inventions, for instance, steam engines, aeroplanes, boat propellers and other machines. He was most famous as an aviation pioneer and he became known as "Flyg-Nyberg". From 1897, onward, outside his home in Lidingö he built and tested his Flugan (The Fly).
- Frans Wilhelm Lindqvist (1862–1931) was a Swedish inventor. He designed the first sootless kerosene stove, operated by compressed air.
- Gustaf Dalén (1869–1937) founded AGA, and received the Nobel Prize for his sun valve.
- Jonas Patrik Ljungström (1827–1898), cartographer, and geodesist
- The latter's sons Fredrik Ljungström (1875–1964) and Birger Ljungström (1872–1948) accounted for hundreds of patents each. They first invented and designed the Svea bicycle with freewheel and a rear-wheel brake (1892), still the most common type in Sweden. Subsequent to contributing to milking machines, they invented high-pressure steam boilers and a new type of steam turbine, the Ljungström turbine (patented in 1894), turbine-powered Ljungström locomotives, the air preheater, as well as inventions for sailing boats, such as the Ljungström rig.
- Sven Gustaf Wingqvist (1876–1953) was a Swedish engineer, inventor and industrialist, and one of the founders of Svenska Kullagerfabriken (S.K.F.), one of the world's leading ball- and roller bearing makers. Sven Wingqvist invented the multi-row self-aligning radial ball bearing in 1907.
- Hans von Kantzow (1887–1979) is known to have invented the steel alloy Kanthal. In 1931 AB Kanthal was founded for the exploitation of the invention.
- One of John Ericsson's (1803–89) most important inventions was ship propellers. Ericsson became widely famous when he built the USS Monitor, an armoured battleship that in 1862 triumphed over the Confederate States' Merrimack in an American Civil War sea battle.
- Theodor Svedberg (1884–1971) invented the ultracentrifugation method for determination of molecular weights in 1924.
- Anders Knutsson Ångström (1888–1981) was a Swedish physicist and meteorologist who was known primarily for his contributions to the field of atmospheric radiation. He is credited with the invention of the pyranometer, the first device to accurately measure direct and indirect solar radiation.
- Boris Hagelin (1892–1983) was a Swedish businessman and inventor of encryption machines.
- Carl Munters (1897–1989), Swedish inventor, best known for inventing the gas absorption refrigerator. After inventing the foam plastic he started his own company and developed, among other things, new insulation materials, air conditioners, and dehumidification devices. At his death, Munters had over a thousand patents.
- Carl Edvard Johansson (1864-1943) invented gauge blocks in 1896 which are the main means of industrial length standardization.

== 20th century ==
- Laila Ohlgren (1937–2014), inventor of mobile phone call-button dialling based on phone storage of the number to be dialled
- Arne Asplund (1903–1993) was inventor of the Defibrator pulping refiner and the defibrator-method (also called Asplund-method) for pulping wooden chips.
- Oscar Kjellberg was a Swedish inventor and industrialist. Founder of ESAB, in 1904, and Kjellberg Finsterwalde, in 1922. He invented the coated electrode used in manual metal arc welding (Swedish Patent: 27152, 29 June 1907), by dipping a bare iron wire in a thick mixture of carbonates and silicates. His pioneering of covered electrode development paved the road during the next twenty years in the research of reliable flux coated electrodes.
- Nils Alwall (1904–1986), a Swedish professor was a pioneer in hemodialysis and the inventor of one of the first practical dialysis machines. Alwall pioneered the technique of ultrafiltration and introduced the principle of hemofiltration. Alwall is referred to as the "father of extracorporeal blood treatment."
- Austria's Carl Hellmuth Hertz (1915–80) began research on ultrasound in medical examinations in the early 1950, thereby becoming known throughout the world. A Swedish physician, Inge Edler (b. 1911-2001) told Hertz that he wanted to devise a non-invasive method for examining the heart. Echocardiography has revolutionized cardiovascular diagnostics. In 1977 Hertz and Edler received the American equivalent of the Nobel Prize in medicine, the Lasker Prize. The use of ultrasound in medical diagnostics is increasing sharply in a number of different fields.
- Harry Roberts is the co-inventor of julmust and founder of Roberts in Örebro, Sweden. After studying chemistry in Germany during the late 19th century he invented the soft drink together with his father Robert Roberts.
- Johan Richter (1901–1997) invented during the 1930s the continuous bleaching process for paper. Then during the WW2 he took on the more challenging continuous cooking process for pulp. Virtually all paper in the world is today produced with processes developed by Richter. He holds more than 750 patents.
- Nils Bohlin (1920–2002) was a Swedish inventor who invented the three-point safety belt while working at Volvo.
- Arvid Gerhard Damm (died 1927) was a Swedish engineer and inventor. He designed a number of cipher machines, and was one of the early inventors of the wired rotor principle for machine encipherment. His company, AB Cryptograph, was a predecessor of Crypto AG.
- René Malaise (1892–1978) was a Swedish entomologist, explorer and art collector who is mostly known for his invention of the Malaise trap and his systematic collection of thousands of insects.
- Although not initially invented by a Swede the design of the zipper was improved upon and patented by two Swedish-Americans, Peter Aronsson and Gideon Sundbäck.
- Baltzar von Platen and Carl Munters in 1922, invented the absorption Refrigerator while they were still students at the Royal Institute of Technology in Stockholm, Sweden. It became a worldwide success and was commercialized by Electrolux.
- Sven Wingquist (1876–1953) invented the self-aligning ball bearing in 1907. He founded a global company, SKF (AB Svenska Kullagerfabriken), still the world's leading producer of industrial bearings.
- Arvid Palmgren (1890–1971) invented the spherical roller bearing in 1919 when working for SKF. This bearing could take considerably heavier loads than the self-aligning ball bearings, and was quickly adopted by heavy industries.
- Tetra Pak (1951) is an invention for storing, packaging and distributing liquid foodstuffs, for example, milk and juice. Erik Wallenberg (1915–99) was the main inventor, while businessman Ruben Rausing (1895–1983) developed and produced it. (See box). Several new package types have been added. The most ubiquitous is the Tetra Brik (1969).
- In the late 1950s, the first working Bottle Return Machine (or Reverse vending machine) was invented and manufactured by "Wicanders" from Sweden.
- Håkan Lans (born 1947) is recognised as one of Sweden's most outstanding inventors. Among his inventions is the digitizer, the predecessor of the computer mouse. He is also credited with the further development of the satellite-guided Global Positioning System (GPS) into the Automatic Identification System (AIS). Lans's system has become world standard for shipping and civil aviation. He is also famous for a patent regarding computer graphics.
- Magnus Kellström (1941–) is an engineer graduated from Chalmers University of Technology that invented the toroidal roller bearing (also known as SKF CARB bearing). The bearing was introduced in 1995, and forms together with a spherical roller bearing a "self-aligning system".
- The energy saving light bulb was invented by a consortium at the Royal Institute of Technology (KTH) in Stockholm in 1973.
- In the 1990s, an ABB team under Mats Leijon developed a new generator, the Power Former, producing high-tension current directly to the network without transformer links.
- Arne Tiselius (1902–71) used electrophoresis in the 1940s to analyse various proteins. Tiselius's work has been followed by other similar methods. All are important for medical and biological research. Tiselius received the Nobel Prize for chemistry in 1948.
- In 1958, Rune Elmqvist developed a small battery-powered pacemaker that can be inserted under the skin of a heart patient. It produces electrical impulses that help the heart muscle work normally. In the same year, Åke Senning at the Karolinska Hospital in Stockholm carried out the world's first pacemaker operation.
- Peter Nordin (1965–2020) was a Swedish computer scientist who has contributed to artificial intelligence, automatically generated computer programming, machine learning, and evolutionary robotics.
- In 1968, Lars Leksell (1907–86) invented the gamma knife for brain surgery. The 'knife' uses concentrated gamma radiation on the tumour or malformation. The method is bloodless and patients can often leave hospital on the day of the operation.
- The transmission of high voltage direct current, HVDC, is a method developed at ASEA (now ABB) under Uno Lamm (1904–89). ABB remains one of the leading makers of HVDC technology, now also used for terrain cable.
- Losec, an ulcer medicine, was the world's best-selling drug in the 1990s and was developed by Ivan Östholm and Sven Erik Sjöstrand of Astra.
- In 1973, Bengt Ilon invented the Mecanum wheel, a wheel which is capable of moving in any direction.
- In 1975, John Arne Ingemund Ekstrand invented the red dot sight.
- In 1993, Dr. Vladimir Ronin invents the process to produce Energetically Modified Cement ("EMC Cement"), whilst at Luleå University of Technology.

== 21st century ==
- Adam Dunkels was recognized by American MIT's Technology Review as one of the top 35 young inventors in the world, notably for Micro IP which allows tiny gadgets such as car keys and credit cards to communicate using Internet protocols.
