= Champis =

Swedish soft drink

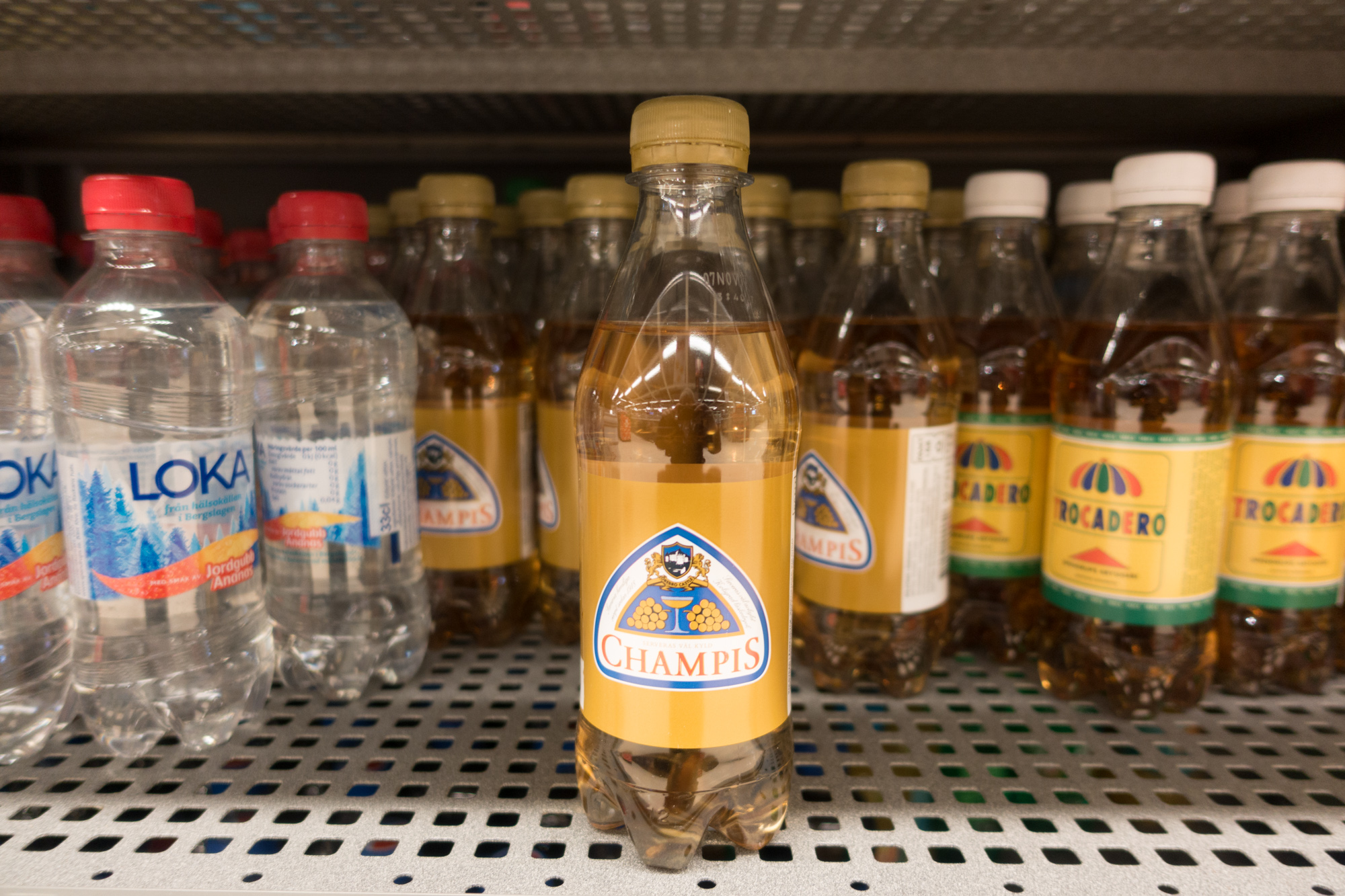
- Bottles of Champis on a store shelf
- Type: Soft drink
- Manufacturer: Roberts AB (extract)
- Origin: Sweden, Örebro
- Introduced: 1918
- Flavour: Champagne

Champis is a soft drink created by Robert Roberts in 1918. It was sold already in 1910, but then under a different name. The recipe is secret and the extract is produced by Roberts in Örebro and sold to breweries who prepare and distribute the final product. Along with Sockerdricka, Citronil, Pomril, and Pommac, Champis is one in the first generation of Swedish soft drinks.
