= Aderman =

Aderman is a surname. Notable people with the surname include:

- Ernest Aderman (1894–1968), New Zealand politician
- Sven Åderman, Swedish inventor and military officer

== See also ==
- Adermann
