= Immune Therapy Holdings =

Swedish biotechnology R&D holding company

Immune Therapy Holdings AB
- Company type: Privately held Aktiebolag
- Industry: Research and development
- Founded: 2005
- Headquarters: Stockholm, Sweden
- Key people: Ahsan Amjad (CEO), Ola Winqvist (CTO), Hans Glise (Chairman),
- Products: Immunotherapy
- Website: ithgroup.se

Immune Therapy Holdings AB or ITH is a Swedish biotechnology R&D holding company headquartered at the Karolinska Institutet and Karolinska University Hospital in Stockholm.

ITH's research is primarily focused on its Tailored Leukapheresis (TLA) treatment for immune mediated inflammatory diseases (IMIDs).

== Tailored Leukapheresis treatment ==
Tailored Leukapheresis (TLA) treatment is an apheresis immunotherapy for selective removal of disease-causing pro-inflammatory cells extracorporeally, which has therapeutic application in various IMIDs that are caused and maintained by inflammation.

TLA utilises the natural affinity of chemokines and chemokine receptors to selectively attract, bind, and deplete circulating pro-inflammatory cells en route to the site of inflammation. It is the first, and hitherto novel, apheresis technology with a demonstrated efficacy in targeting and removing selected leukocytes while leaving all other blood cells unaffected.

The immunotherapy has been evaluated in a Phase I/II placebo-controlled clinical trial, where all primary and secondary clinical endpoints were met and the treatment showed an absence of any side effects of clinical significance.

== Awards and funding ==
TLA received the Dagens Medicin's Athena Prize (Sweden, 2013) and Universal Biotech Innovation Prize (France, 2012). During 2014, TLA was selected by the Swedish Institute for its Innovative Sweden exhibition that highlights Swedish innovativeness worldwide.

TLA has received competitive research funding from the following sources:

- 2010: Swedish Governmental Agency for Innovation Systems (Phase I/II Clinical Trial on IBD): SEK 5 Million.
- 2012: European Union Eureka EUROSTARS (Phase I/II Clinical Trial on ARDS): SEK 5 Million.
- 2013: Swedish Research Council (Phase I/II Clinical Trial on paediatric IBD, PSC, alcoholic hepatitis, RA, MS and ALS): SEK 5 Million.
- 2013: Swedish Governmental Agency for Innovation Systems (Phase II Clinical Trial on IBD): SEK 5 Million

== Target market ==
The global anti-inflammatory therapeutics market was $57.8 billion in 2010 and is estimated to increase at a CAGR of 5.8% between 2010 and 2017 to a total value of $85.9 billion.
