= Kjellberg Finsterwalde =

- Company type: Group of companies
- Industry: Mechanical Engineering
- Founded: 1922
- Headquarters: Finsterwalde, Witten, Massen, Germany
- Products: Plasma Cutting Technology, Welding Technology, Welding Electrodes
- Number of employees: approx. 280 (2008)
- Website: www.kjellberg.de

Kjellberg Finsterwalde is a group of German companies in the metal and electrical industry. The group consists of the three manufacturing companies, Kjellberg Finsterwalde Plasma und Maschinen GmbH, Kjellberg Finsterwalde Schweißtechnik und Verschleißschutzsysteme GmbH and Kjellberg Finsterwalde Elektroden und Zusatzwerkstoffe GmbH, and the Kjellberg Finsterwalde Dienstleistungsgesellschaft mbH, which fulfils group-wide functions. Sole shareholder of the group is the Kjellberg Foundation, with its registered seat in the Hessian city of Gießen. The group manufactures products for thermal metal working (welding, plasma cutting).

Approximately 280 employees at the three locations in Finsterwalde, Massen and Witten achieved annual sales of about € 47 million in 2008, with international sales accounting for more than half of this amount. The group holds a share of equity in a Slovak company and has a network of partners worldwide.

Kjellberg Finsterwalde manufactures plasma cutting technology (up to 600 A), automatic welding machines and welding electrodes for industrial purposes, with part of the products customised. For example, Kjellberg equipment is used in the shipbuilding, automotive and plant construction industries.

== Early history ==
On 27 June 1908, the Swede Oscar Kjellberg received German Imperial patent no. 231733 "Electrode and procedure for electrical soldering" and is therefore recognised as the inventor of the coated welding electrode.

In his capacity as general manager of the company ESAB, in 1921 Kjellberg established Kjellberg Elektroden GmbH in Berlin together with six German and Swedish partners, for the purpose of manufacturing and marketing the patented welding electrodes. For lack of suitable power sources and at Oscar Kjellberg's suggestion, Kjellberg Elektro-Maschinen GmbH was established in Finsterwalde in 1922. In 1923, the company's first welding generator developed and built in Finsterwalde, Ke 200/1450, was presented at the Leipzig spring fair. Later that year, the production of welding electrodes started in Finsterwalde. The oldest product was the rod electrode OK G2/1, which was used for repair welding.

== Renaming ==
In 1926, the company was renamed Kjellberg Elektroden und Maschinen GmbH, reflecting the company's changed range of products.

In 1930, welding converters laid the foundation for Kjellberg's worldwide success. The fundamentally new concept of these machines was the unification of all components under one housing, including control section and steerable carrier. Later, these converters were further developed into automatic welding machines. Experimental studies on automatic arc welding started in 1934. With the market launch of the automatic welding machines S I and S II in 1937, mechanised welding for industrial purposes was possible for the first time. Kjellberg offered three technological options for mechanised welding: with exchangeable electrode head for endless welding of rod electrodes, with welding head for bare wire coils and with carbon head for thin sheet welding.

Significant achievements were the steel construction of the Berlin Tempelhof Airport and the Schlachthofbrücke (Slaughterhouse Bridge) in Dresden.

Starting in 1935, the electrode pressing method improved the strength of the coating as well as welding quality compared to the previously standard dipping. One major reference object for this new method is the so-called Kjellberg Hochbau, Germany's first building with an entirely welded steel frame construction. With its completion in 1936, Kjellberg expanded its manufacturing plant at the headquarters in Finsterwalde. For the 5-storey industrial building 460 tonnes of steel was used and approximately 35,000 m of welding seam was formed.

In 1941, the patented Kaell-Kjellberg-Lundin method considerably improved the efficiency of metal working. In this technique, a double wire electrode was welded in three arcs simultaneously. At that time, Kjellberg was the world's largest manufacturer of arc welding technology.

In 1943, after just two months of development, Kjellberg introduced the so-called Maulwurf (mole) – the first industrial solution for automated submerged arc welding.

In 1959, the Professor Manfred von Ardenne Institute in Dresden carried out the first basic tests for plasma-arc cutting of high-alloyed steel and aluminium with argon-hydrogen in cooperation with Kjellberg Finsterwalde. In 1962, Kjellberg Finsterwalde began selling the WSH III-M plasma cutting system with 50 KW – the first industry-ready plasma cutting system. In the same year, this procedure was further developed into the FineFocus plasma cutting technology and then patented.

== Reorganisation ==
In 1970, the company was reorganised as the Volkseigener Betrieb Schweißtechnik Finsterwalde and became a unit of the Mansfeld Combine. In the following year, plasma cutting machines were used in parallel operation for the first time. Eight machines of the first series were sold to Japan.

In 1973, the plasma cutting unit PA 40 cut using oxygen for the first time, a more cost-effective method.

In 1979, a collective of researchers from Kjellberg and the Professor Manfred von Ardenne Institute were awarded the GDR National Prize for Science and Technology for their scientific and technical work developing the plasma melt cutting process.

In 1984, Kjellberg granted the O-A-Mach Corporation in Tokyo a licence to produce and sell plasma cutting torches, since the required quantities for the Japanese market could not be delivered in time due to lack of capacity in Finsterwalde.

In 1986, inverters were used for the first time as power sources for welding and plasma cutting, and a plasma cutting machine for underwater cutting was introduced. At that time, the company had 1064 employees.

In 1991, following German reunification, the company was restructured and the product range fundamentally overhauled. In collaboration with Leibniz University Hannover and the HDW Kiel shipyard, multi-torch bevel aggregates were used for the first time in the "Shipbuilding 2000" project in 1993.

In 1996, Kjellberg introduced plasma gouging technology for industrial metal processing as an alternative to gouging with carbon electrodes.

== The Kjellberg Foundation ==
In 1997, the Kjellberg Foundation was established and became the company's sole shareholder. In 1999, a new assembly shop and shipping department at the headquarters in Finsterwalde considerably improved production conditions.

In 2000, the new HiFocus plasma cutting technology, with laser-like precision, was placed on the market. In the following year, the launch of the HiFinox technology for the first time worldwide permitted metallic clean and dross-free cuts on thin sheets of chromium nickel steel. The world's first flow-controlled automatic plasma gas supply in 2003 was an advance creating better quality and reproducibility of plasma cuts.

In 2004, a new record was established by using three FineFocus 800 plasma cutting machines connected in parallel for the dismantling of a disconnected nuclear reactor at the Karlsruhe Institute of Technology. 130 mm thick Stainless steel walls were cut under remote control in water depths of several metres.

In 2008, Kjellberg Finsterwalde Elektroden und Maschinen GmbH was divided into three separate companies: Kjellberg Finsterwalde Plasma und Maschinen GmbH, Kjellberg Finsterwalde Schweißtechnik und Verschleißschutzsysteme GmbH and Kjellberg Finsterwalde Elektroden und Zusatzwerkstoffe GmbH, with Kjellberg Finsterwalde Dienstleistungsgesellschaft mbH fulfilling group-wide functions. The headquarters of Kjellberg Finsterwalde Schweißtechnik und Verschleißschutzsysteme moved to Witten, in North Rhine-Westphalia. Kjellberg Finsterwalde Elektroden und Zusatzwerkstoffe GmbH inaugurated its new manufacturing facility at the Massen location.
