= DJO Global =

American medical device company

DJO, LLC
- Type: Subsidiary
- Industry: Medical devices
- Founded: 1978, Carlsbad, California
- Founder: Mark Nordquist
- Headquarters: 2900 Lake Vista Drive Lewisville, TX 75067
- Key people: Brady Shirley, CEO
- Products: Orthopedic Devices
- Revenue: ▲$1.19 billion (2017)
- Number of employees: 5,200
- Parent: Enovis
- Website: http://www.djoglobal.com/

DJO is an American medical device company headquartered in Lewisville, Texas, that produces a variety of orthopedic products for rehabilitation, pain management, and physical therapy. It has multiple divisions including Bracing & Supports, Surgical, Footcare, Healthcare Solutions, Recovery, and Consumer.

DJO has more than five thousand employees in more than a dozen facilities around the world.

== History ==
DJO began in 1978 as DonJoy, a small company founded in a Carlsbad, California garage by the Philadelphia Eagles’ offensive line captain, Mark Nordquist and a local lawyer, Ken Reed. Together, they named their new company after their wives, Donna and Joy.

In 1987, the company was acquired by British medical device conglomerate, Smith & Nephew, for $20 million.

In 1999, the DonJoy management team arranged a leveraged buyout, changed the name from DonJoy to DJ Orthopedics, and took the company public again in 2001. Over the next several years, the company acquired all or part of seven new companies.

In 2007, Blackstone Group bought DJO for $1.6 billion, renaming the company DJO Global.

In the first quarter of 2019, Colfax Corporation, a publicly traded, diversified technology company, acquired DJO.

In 2018, the company announced plans to move its headquarters to Lewisville, Texas.

== Controversies ==
In 2017, DJO Global became embroiled in a controversy surrounding the potential mishandling of patient information. It was revealed that individuals who had received a DJO Global product while being treated at the Siena, San Martin, or De Lima campuses of St. Rose Dominican Hospital in Las Vegas, Nevada, between July 17, 2017, and October 16, 2017, might have encountered issues with their personal data.

During their medical visits to the emergency room, Same Day Surgery Center, or Urgent Care site, these individuals were asked to fill out and sign a DJO Global Patient Product Agreement ("PPA") form, which served as an acknowledgment of their receipt of the product. However, concerns arose when it was discovered that shortly after the completion of the form, an employee of DJO's vendor collected it for mailing to DJO. It was suspected that the PPA forms might have been lost during transit.

The timeline of events indicates that the loss of the forms likely occurred between the moment DJO's vendor retrieved them from St. Rose Dominican Hospital and the subsequent drop-off at FedEx.

In compliance with the Health Insurance Portability and Accountability Act (HIPAA), DJO Global took steps to notify the affected individuals through their official website. It was expected that individuals would receive a copy of the PPA form from their respective doctors. The PPA forms potentially contained sensitive personal information, including the individual's name, address, phone number, date of birth, physician's name and location, product information, product order date, date of injury, diagnosis code(s), health plan information, and health plan identification number, which might incorporate the social security number.

The handling and potential loss of these PPA forms raised concerns regarding patient privacy and data protection, leading to scrutiny and questions about DJO Global's internal processes for safeguarding sensitive information.

In January 2018, DJO Global Inc., agreed to pay a substantial sum of $7.62 million to resolve allegations that its now-defunct subsidiary, Empi Inc. (Empi), had submitted false claims to TRICARE. These claims involved "excessive and unnecessary" transcutaneous electrical nerve stimulation (TENS) electrodes that TRICARE beneficiaries allegedly did not need or use.

The agreement revolved around allegations against Empi Inc., a now-defunct subsidiary of DJO Global Inc., based in Minnesota. It was claimed that Empi Inc. had submitted false claims for a therapy that employed low-voltage electrical current to provide pain relief.
