= Adermann =

Adermann is a surname. Notable people with the surname include:

- Charles Adermann (1896–1979), Australian politician
- Evan Adermann (1927–2001), Australian politician

== See also ==
- Aderman
