= Halltorps hage =

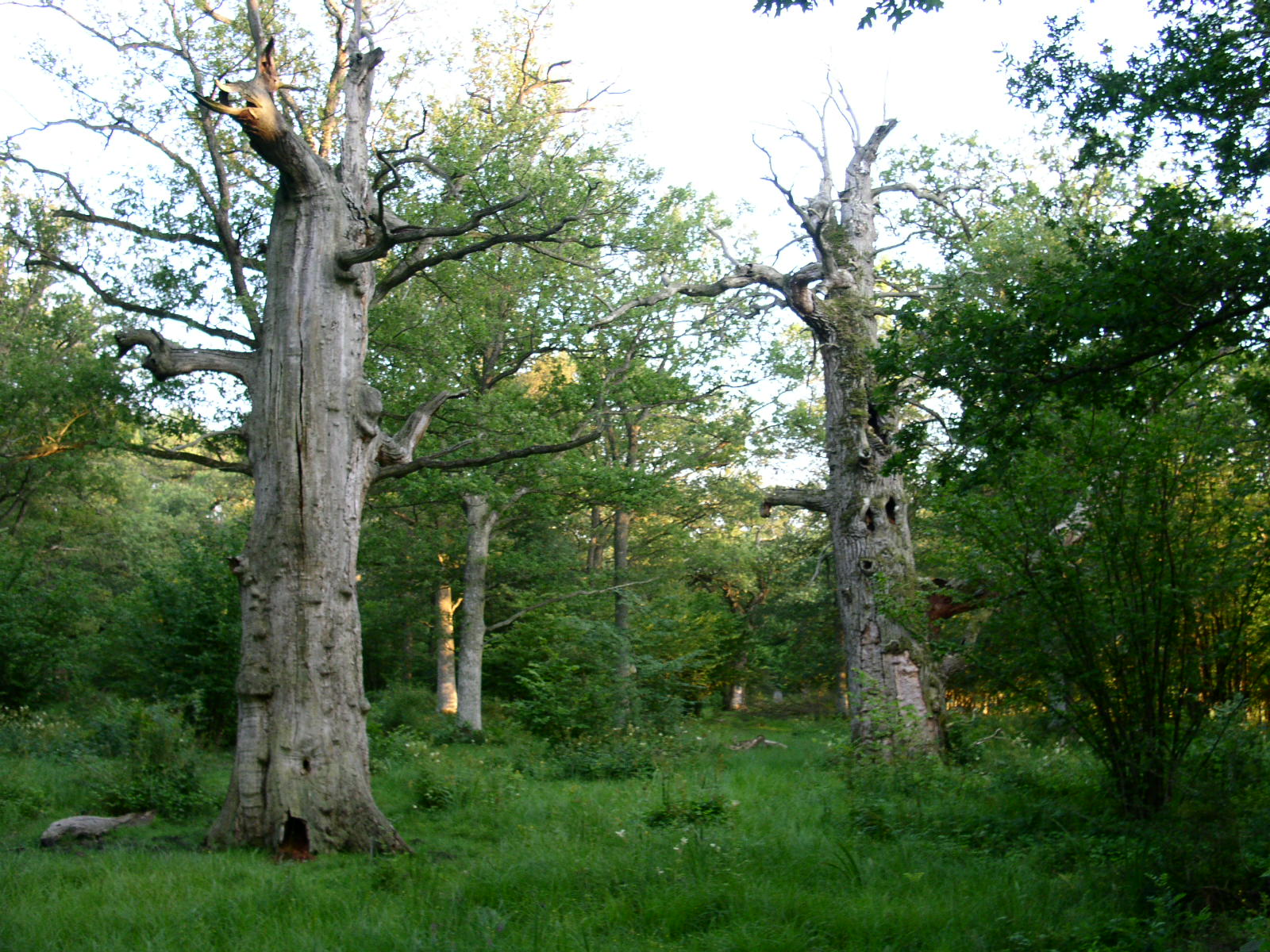

- Location within Kalmar
- Location: Sweden
- Nearest city: Kalmar
- Coordinates: 56°47′45″N 16°34′24″E
- Area: 198 ha (490 acres)

Halltorps hage is a nature reserve on the island of Öland in Borgholm Municipality, Kalmar County, Sweden.

The nature reserve serves to protect an area with varied deciduous forest. At the heart of the reserve is a pasture dominated by several large oaks. Other trees found in the reserve include ash, linden, maple and hornbeam. Flowers such as spring vetchling, yellow anemone and the unusual Veronica montana grow in the nature reserve. The nature reserve is part of the EU-wide Natura 2000-network.

== See also ==
- Halltorp
