= Howden Turbo =

German engineering company

Howden Turbo GmbH is a German engineering company, based in Frankenthal in the state of Rhineland-Palatinate. The company was formed after Colfax Corporation acquired Siemens Turbomachinery Equipment GmbH (STE) from Siemens in October 2017 for €195 million. The old brand name Kühnle, Kopp & Kausch has been returned to use. The Kühnle, Kopp & Kausch AG (AG KK&K) was a German mechanical engineering company based in Frankenthal. The company was acquired by Siemens and bore the name Siemens Turbomachinery Equipment GmbH (STE) until 2017. The company was renamed Howden Turbo GmbH through the sale to Colfax Corporation and Howden.

== History ==
It was founded in 1899 by the merger of three family businesses by Georg Adam Kühnle, Hans Kopp and Rudolf Kausch.

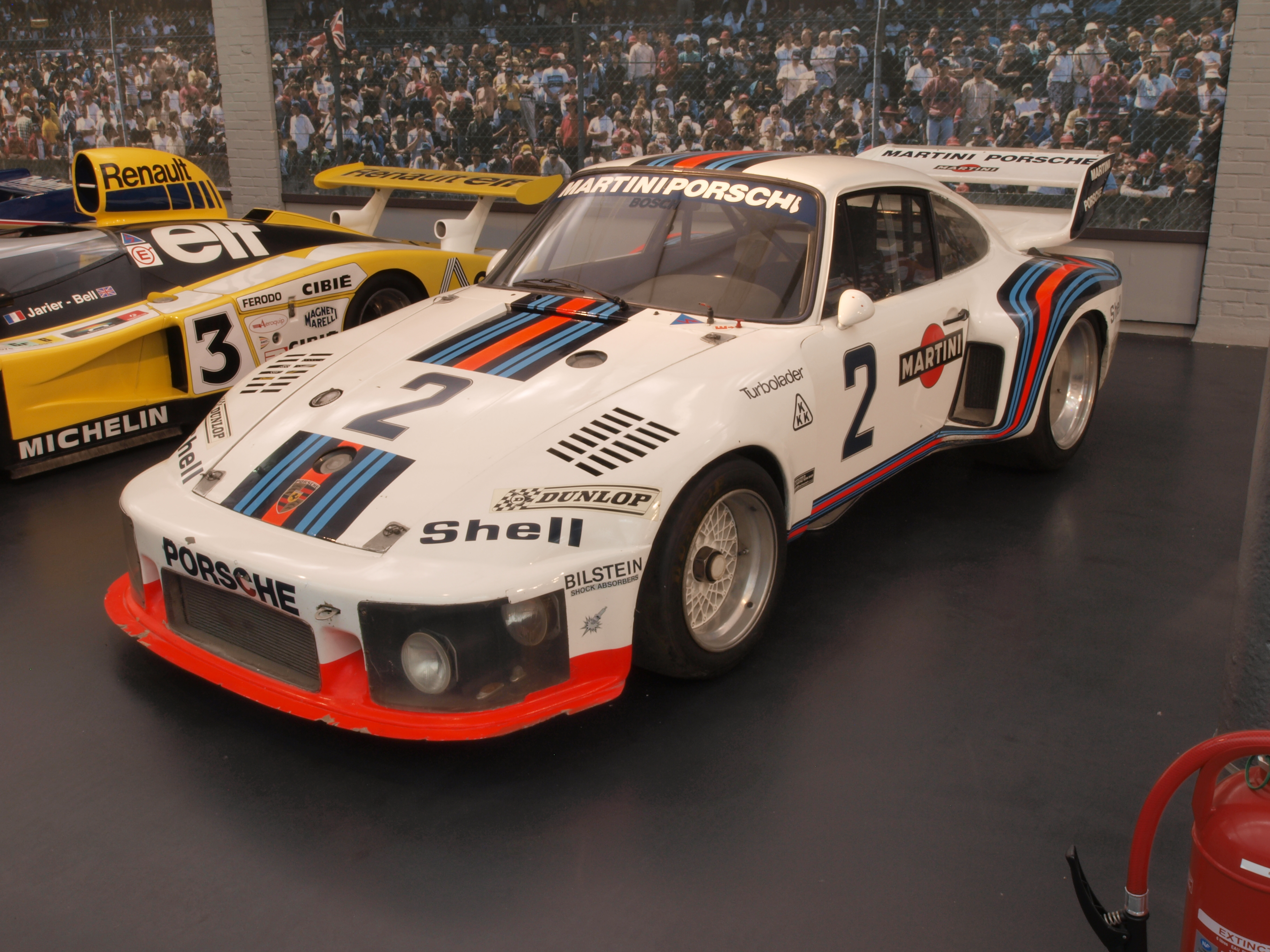
1976 Porsche 935 with triangular "Turbolader KKK" sticker on the front fender

In 1976, the World Championship winning Martini-sponsored factory Porsche 935 turbo race car used a single KKK turbocharger, and had a triangular "Turbolader KKK" sticker on the front fender. The 1977 and 1978 versions had bi-turbo engines.

In 1983, the Motoren- und Turbinen-Union (MTU), Munich, acquired the majority of shares. After MTU was acquired by Daimler-Benz two years later, Kühnle, Kopp & Kausch became (indirectly) a subsidiary of Daimler-Benz.

The Penske Corporation acquired in 1994 the majority of Kuhnle, Kopp & Kausch from the Daimler-Benz group MTU.

In 1997, BorgWarner Automotive, a leading global automotive supplier, acquired the majority of the shares in Kühnle, Kopp & Kausch.

In 1998 the turbocharging systems division was spun off to become 3K-Warner Turbosystems as a subsidiary of BorgWarner.

The company "Turbo Group" and the Frankfurt private equity firm ECM acquired Kühnle, Kopp & Kausch in March 2005.

In July 2006 Kühnle, Kopp & Kausch was taken over by Siemens Power Generation Group. On November 22, 2006, this acquisition was completed by Siemens.

Kühnle, Kopp & Kausch supplements the Siemens PG with industrial steam turbines up to five megawatts; in the case of "Tridem" and "Quadriga" systems (three or four turbines work together), up to ten megawatts are possible. Turbo compressors and process gas compressors complete the range offered by Siemens PG, with the turbocharger division for motor vehicles sold to BorgWarner in 1997. The turbines from Kühnle, Kopp & Kausch are used for power generation or as mechanical drives in industry. Compressors are used in the chemical industry as well as in the water and wastewater industries. Fans are used in power plants, mines and in the steel and cement industries.

On June 12, 2007, the name of the company was changed to Siemens Turbomachinery Equipment GmbH (STE).

In October 2015, Siemens Power Generation announced its intention to relocate the production of turbines to the Czech plant in Brno for cost reasons; that would have meant cutting back 210 of the then 600 jobs. Following fierce protests and many discussions, including with the works council and IG Metall, Siemens Power Generation then began selling the complete plant from the beginning of 2016.

The Scottish engineering company Howden, announced in March 2018 that it would take over the company. Howden is part of the US engineering group Colfax Corporation. The purchase price was 195 million euros. Along with the Palatine factory there are also branches in Springfield, Missouri, Helsingor, Denmark and Mornago, Italy.

Howden Turbo GmbH, headquartered in Frankenthal, was founded on October 3, 2017, through the acquisition of Howden.
