= Enovis =

American medical technology company

Enovis Corporation
- Formerly: Colfax Corporation (1995–2022)
- Type: Public
- Traded as: NYSE: ENOV; S&P 600 component
- ISIN: US1940145022
- Industry: Medical technology
- Founded: 1995; 31 years ago
- Founders: Mitchell and Steven Rales
- Headquarters: Dallas, Texas, U.S.
- Key people: Damien McDonald (CEO)
- Revenue: ▲US$2.25 billion (2025)
- Net income: ▼ −US$1.18 billion (2025)
- Number of employees: 8,000+ (2026)
- Website: enovis.com

Enovis Corporation is a medical technology company with a focus in orthopedics. The company was founded by brothers Mitchell and Steven Rales as the Colfax Corporation in 1995. Enovis is headquartered in Dallas, Texas and is listed on the NYSE as ENOV. The company has over 8,000 employees operating at 30 sites around the world.

== History ==
The company was founded in 1995 as the Colfax Corporation in Richmond, Virginia, by brothers Steven and Mitchell Rales. In August 1997, Colfax acquired approximately 93% of IMO's common stock through a public tender offer. At the time of the acquisition, IMO was a diversified industrial manufacturer, with $469.0 million in annual revenue and five business units: Boston Gear, IMO Pump, Morse Controls, Gems Sensors, and Roltra Morse. Simultaneously with the closing of the tender offer, IMO divested its Gems Sensors and Roltra Morse units to narrow the strategic focus to power transmission and fluid handling.

In January 2012, Colfax completed the acquisition of Charter International, successor to the British South Africa Company, and the parent company of ESAB (welding and cutting) and Howden (air and gas handling products), for $2.4 billion. More than 25 acquisitions were completed from 2012–2019 to build-out the three industrial businesses, fluid handling, fabrication technologies (ESAB), and air & gas handling (Howden).

In December 2017, Colfax sold its original fluid handling platform to Circor International for cash and stock with a total estimated aggregate consideration of $860 million. In November 2018, Colfax expanded into the medical device space by acquiring DJO Global from The Blackstone Group for $3.15bn. In May 2019, KPS Capital Partners (KPS) announced that it has signed an agreement to acquire Howden Turbo from Colfax Corporation for $1.8bn.

In March 2021, Colfax announced that it would spin off its ESAB industrial business in a tax-efficient manner and pursue a focused medical technologies strategy. This spin-off was completed in April 2022, following which ESAB became an independent public company and Colfax was renamed Enovis. The spin-off was the final action taken to transform the portfolio of businesses from purely industrial to medical technologies. These actions included divesting the fluid handling and air and gas handling businesses in 2017 and 2019, respectively, and acquiring DJO Global in 2019. Additional acquisitions were made, and Colfax went public with an initial public offering in May 2008 as a fluid handling company. The headquarters were subsequently moved to Annapolis Junction, Maryland.

In September 2023, Enovis announced that it had reached a definitive agreement to acquire the Villanova di San Daniele del Friuli-headquartered medical device company LimaCorporate for approximately €800 million. On January 3, 2024, it was reported that the purchase of LimaCorporate had been completed.
