= Lima Corporate =

Italian medical device company

LimaCorporate
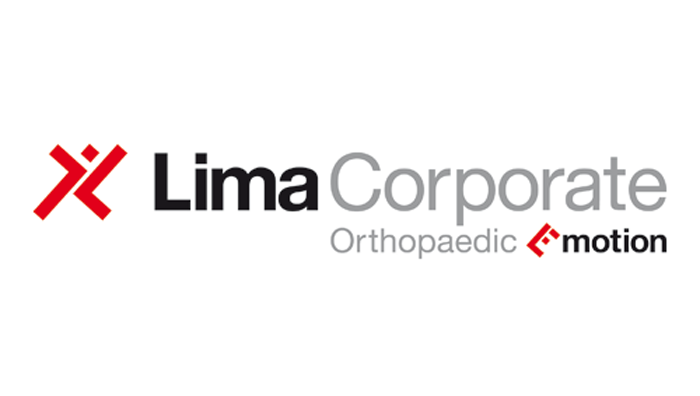
- Type: Medical devices
- Founded: 1945; 81 years ago, in Friuli-Venezia Giulia, Italy
- Founder: Carlo Leopoldo Lualdi
- Headquarters: Villanova, San Daniele del Friuli, Italy
- Key people: Matt Trerotola (Enovis CEO); Louie Vogt (Group President Recon); Benjamin Reinmann (President of Enovis International Surgical)
- Products: Medical devices
- Owner: Enovis (2024–present)
- Website: www.limacorporate.com

LimaCorporate is a medical device company based in Italy, it manufactures joint implants, extremities and fixation. In 2021, the company delivered 3D printing to a hospital setting. Both Italian production plants of LimaCorporate have been certified ISO 14001.

In September 2023, Enovis announced that it had reached an agreement to acquire the company for approximately €800 million. On January 3, 2024, it was reported that the purchase of LimaCorporate had been completed.

== History ==
Engineer and entrepreneur, Carlo Leopoldo Lualdi, LimaCorporate's founder, began producing surgical instruments in 1945. In 2000, Lima began specializing in the production of orthopedic implants. In the early 2000s, LimaCorporate began developing electron-beam melting (EBM) technology, a form of additive manufacturing. In 2007, the company's first acetabular cup was developed.

Lima later announced the completion of a Distribution Agreement with OrthAlign, Inc. for a tibial/femoral handheld navigation device and associated instrumentation to be supplied within the European Economic Area (EEA) and Switzerland (excluding Romania). In addition, the company announced the completion of an assets acquisition process with Zimmer Holdings Inc. on July 3, 2015. The agreement was approved by the Japanese Fair Trade Commission at the end of the same year.

In 2016, EQT, with Hansjörg Wyss as the co-investor, completed the acquisition process for a majority share of LimaCorporate. In 2018, LimaCorporate acquired TechMah Medical LLC, a medical device software company located in the United States. In 2019, LimaCorporate and the Hospital for Special Surgery (HSS) announced the foundation of an additive manufacturing 3D printing facility in a hospital setting. LimaCorporate announced the completion of a distribution agreement with G21 S.r.l. to supply cement spacer molds for the shoulder, hip and knee as well as antibiotic-loaded bone cement. Additionally, the company entered into an agreement with Dedienne Santé S.a.s. to distribute dual mobility acetabular cups in the European Economic Area (EEA) and Switzerland.

In 2020, LimaCorporate inaugurated spaces for 3D Printing at its headquarter campus of San Daniele del Friuli, Italy. In the same year, LimaCorporate became the first Italian company to obtain the EU Quality Management System Certificate under Medical Devices Regulation (MDR) for Class III Custom-Made devices. On March 24, 2021, LimaCorporate opened the ProMade PoC Center for Complex Orthopedic Solutions at the Hospital for Special Surgery (HSS).

== Corporate governance ==
Since March 2016, LimaCorporate has been owned by EQT Private Equity. As of March 2022, EQT's assets under management were €90.0 billion.

Since September 2022, Massimo Calafiore has held the role of CEO. Michele Marin has been the CFO since March 2018. LimaCorporate's advisory board includes:

- Lars Rasmussen, Chairperson of the Board
- Matteo Thun, Board Member
- Xavier Berling, Board Member
- Doug Kohrs, Board Member
- Eric Lohrer, Board Member
- Petra Rumpf, Board Member

In September 2023, EQT Private Equity announced the sale of LimaCorporate to the NYSE-listed Enovis Group. The transaction is expected to close in early 2024.
