= Charter International =

British engineering firm

Charter International plc
- Type: Public (LSE: CHTR)
- Industry: Engineering
- Founded: 1965
- Headquarters: London, UK
- Key people: Lars Emilson, Chairman; Michael Foster, CEO
- Revenue: £1,719.6 million (2010)
- Operating income: £145.9 million (2010)
- Net income: £118.9 million (2010)
- Number of employees: 12,313 (2010)
- Parent: Colfax Corporation
- Website: www.charter.ie

Charter International plc was a large British engineering business based in London. It was acquired by Colfax Corporation in January 2012.

== History ==
Charter International's origins can be traced back to the British South Africa Company, which was founded in 1889 by Royal Charter. During 1965, on the initiative of Anglo American Corporation, the company merged with The Central Mining & Investment Corporation and The Consolidated Mines Selection Company; the combined company was called Charter Consolidated.

Throughout the 1980s, Charter Consolidated gradually disposed of its overseas mining concerns, opting to instead concentrate on its British engineering interests. It also acquired 80% of Morrison Construction, although the Morrison family repurchased the shares in 1989.

During 1993, the company's name changed to Charter plc.

In 1994, it acquired ESAB; three years later, the company also acquired Howden.

During early 1999, the company announced that it was seeking to spin out its subsidiary Pandrol Rail Fastenings. Four years later, Pandrol was acquired by Delachaux of France.

In 2008, the business was restructured with the creation of a new Irish resident holding company, Charter International plc.

During January 2012, the company was acquired by the American technology business Colfax Corporation.

== Operations ==
The company had two main businesses:

- ESAB: welding, cutting and automation
- Howden: air and gas handling
