= Pomril =

Swedish soda

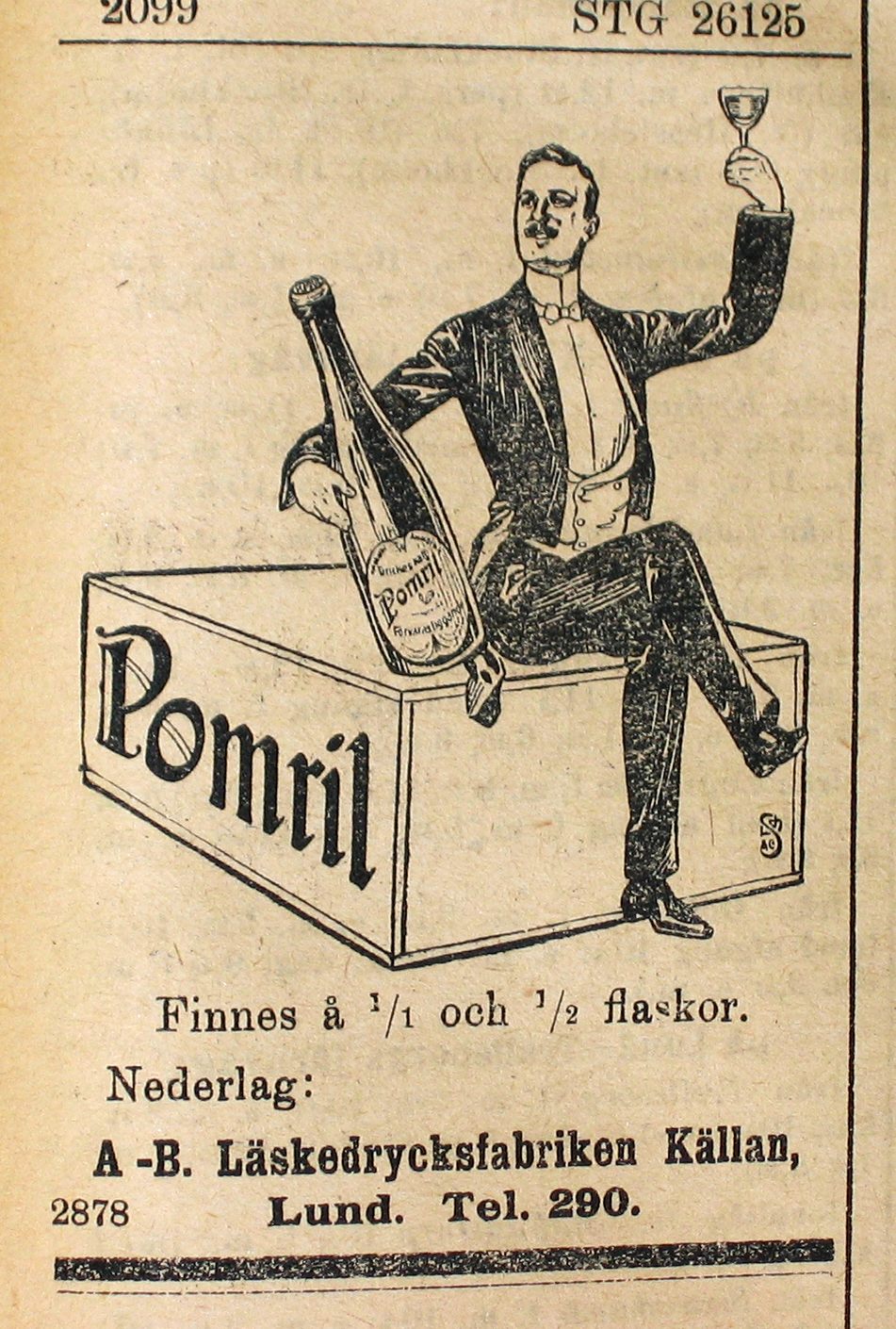
Ad for Pomril in Lunds Dagblad in the summer of 1908.

Pomril is a Swedish soda with origin in Switzerland. In 1905 the company A.B Pomril was founded to produce and sell a Zürich made apple soda.

The soda with the same name as the company was released in shops for the first time in 1906 and became a big seller. In 1911 A.B Pomril started the brand Citronil, but a workers blockade after the company hired strike breakers brought that brand to an end. During World War I the A.B Pomril company and its brand was bought by Apotekarnes. Apotekarnes kept Pomril as its own brand until 1965. In 1999 it started to be sold and produced again, this time by Vasa Bryggeri.
