= Harry Roberts (inventor) =

Swedish inventor

Harry Roberts was a Swedish pharmacist, best known for being the co-inventor of julmust, a soft drink primarily consumed around Christmas. Roberts is also the co-founder of Roberts, a soft drink syrup company founded in Örebro, Sweden in 1910.

After studying chemistry in Germany during the late 19th century he invented the soft drink together with his father Robert Roberts.
