= Halltorp =

Manor in Öland, Sweden

Coordinates: 56°47′59″N 16°34′59″E

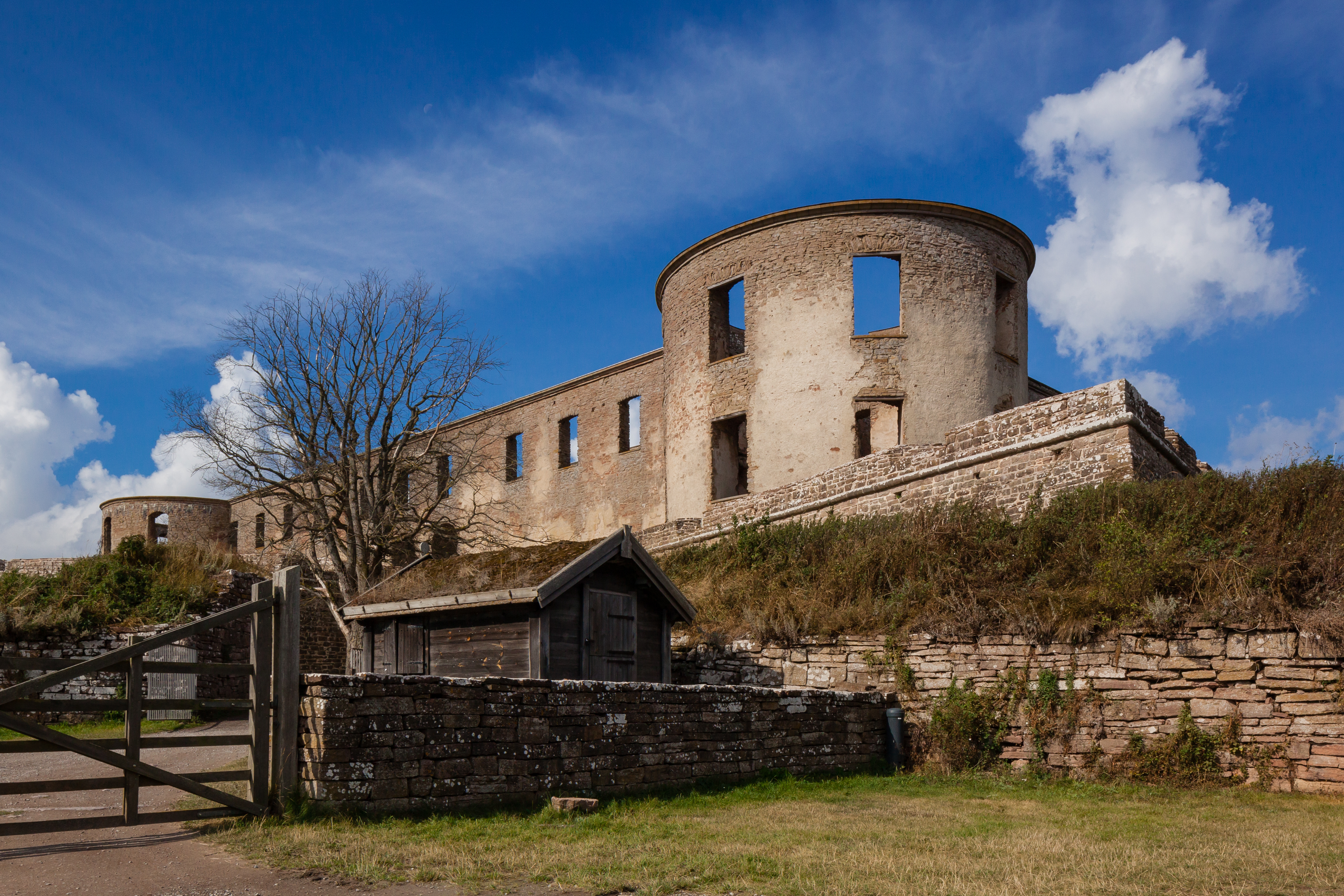
Borgholm Castle ruin, part of the historic Halltorp estate

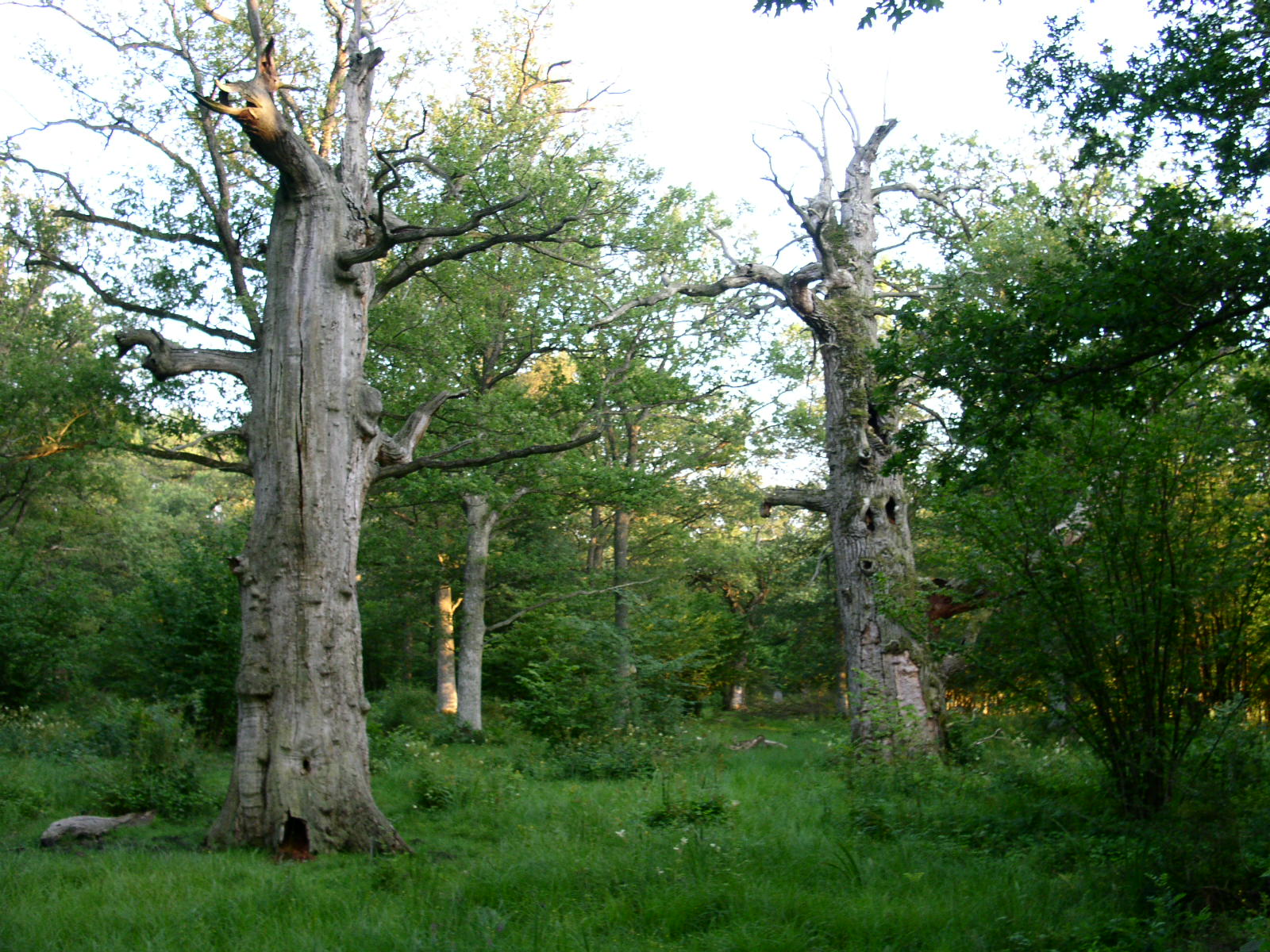
Old oak forest in Halltorps Hage

Halltorp was one of the earliest manors on the island of Öland, Sweden, dating from the 11th century AD. In early documents it is known as Hauldtorp, and it is cited as one of the early Viking Age settlements of Öland. From early times it has functioned as a royal farm associated with the Swedish Crown and was considered one of the finest hunting preserves on the island. There is a relict oak forest on the present grounds which contains numerous trees that are centuries old. Halltorp is in an area rich in history and biodiversity, and most of the southern part of the island of Öland has been designated as a World Heritage Site. The site is adjacent to the perimeter highway, Route 136.

== Architecture ==
Limestone was quarried from the local Stora Alvaret to produce the core of the present manor in the late 18th century, although it is known an earlier manor house stood here for centuries. The limestone blocks obtained from the local alvar are exceptionally flat with little fashioning just as they come from the quarry and are very easy to stack for use in building construction.

== Early history ==
Only Borgholm and Ottenby are documented in early writings to have been Viking era settlements along with Halltorp, although archaeological records show evidence of Vikings at a number of other locations on Öland: namely, Gettlinge, Alby and Hulterstad. A manor house is thought to have existed here since at least the Late Middle Ages. In the 17th century Halltorp was integrated to the royal Borgholm estate, where Borgholm Castle is situated about seven kilometers to the north. The extensive forest area west of Halltorp Manor house ran all the way to Kalmar Strait. The kings of the House of Vasa used this woodland area as one of their prime hunting preserves. Also on site is a great European hornbeam forest, one of the largest within Sweden, that is documented to derive from at least as early as the 17th century.

King Frederick I of Sweden bestowed Halltorp royal farm upon Sven Aderman in the year 1723 to acknowledge his invention of a rapid firing musket during the wars of King Karl XII. By 1760 captain Edvard Lukhehorn was reflected as the owner of Halltorp estate. It has been deduced that a grand manor house of native limestone was created in the late 18th century, which is the core of the present structure. As late as the year 1804 the estate was held by descendants of Lukhehorn.

== From 19th century ==
By 1820 Halltorp estate was partitioned, with the new owners being Baron M. Falkenberg and Colonel A. Von Franchen, the latter who also served as the royal Chamberlain. In this era Halltorp still consisted of its present-day lands as well as the coastal Ekerum estate, a 180 hectare holding having several croft buildings. Then in the year 1859 a parliament member, Erik Johan Rudberg (1821-1899) bought the Halltorp holding, who held it until selling to Johan Persson in 1895.

== Halltorps Gästgiveri ==
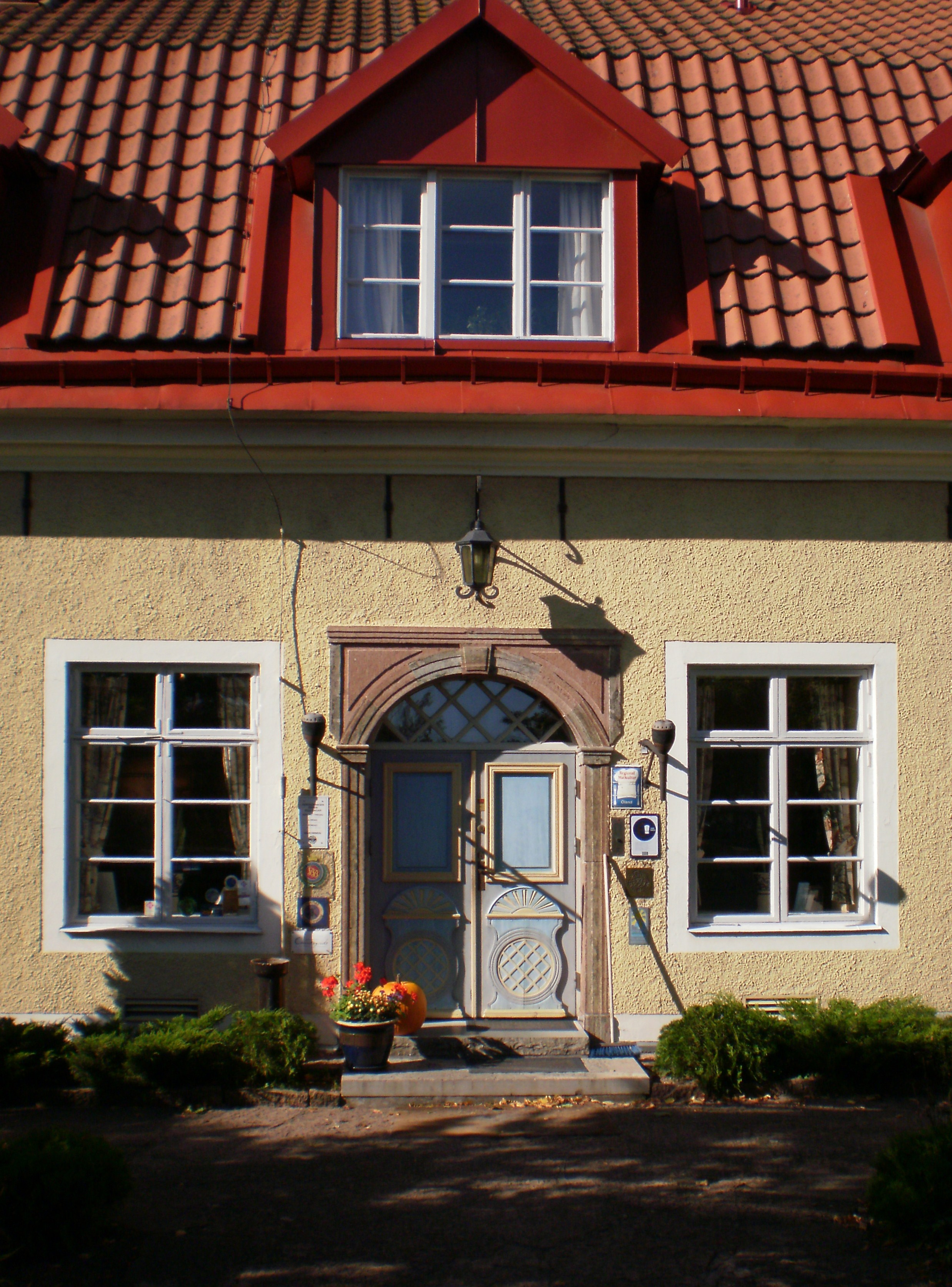
Halltorps Gastgiveri

At the end of World War I Halltorp was sold to three municipalities and was converted into a retirement home, which operated until 1973. Two years later the manor became Halltorps Gästgiveri, an inn with guest rooms. In 1991, a twenty five guest room addition was created in the form of a new wing sweeping to the west joining in L-Plan design to the older manor core. There were also added two spas, a wine cellar, a winter garden and some conference rooms.

The manor house was designed with an entrance facing east, such that upon entering the vestibule, a great hall lay immediately ahead where the present day dining room is situated. Further west of the hall were the south facing kitchen, still the current day kitchen, and two other rooms facing north which have now been adapted to reception areas of the present day inn. The original first floor had a large loft, which area is now converted to guest rooms.

== Halltorps Hage ==
Halltorps hage, the nature reserve at Halltorp lies to the west of the manor house extending to the Kalmar Strait. In addition to the ancient oak forest, this area is known for several wild orchids including: Common spotted orchid, Dactylorhiza fuchsii; Listera ovata; and Bird’s-nest orchid, Neottia nidus-avis. Many other rare and endangered species can be found to the east on the Stora Alvaret, although in this northern part of Öland the alvar habitat is more fragmented than in the south of the island where large expanses of limestone pavement ecosystem exist.

== See also ==
- Kalmar Strait
