= Roberts (syrup company) =

Swedish soft drinks company

AB Roberts i Örebro
- Trade name: Roberts
- Founded: 1910; 116 years ago
- Founders: Harry Roberts; Robert Roberts
- Headquarters: Örebro, Sweden
- Owner: Göran Roberts

Roberts is a company that makes syrup for the traditional Swedish drink julmust. The company was founded in 1910 by Harry Roberts and his father Robert Roberts (1866–1932). The company is located in Örebro, Sweden and currently has 15 employees. The current owner is Göran Roberts, a grandson of Harry. The company does not produce its own soft drinks, only the syrup for other suppliers. Apart from julmust they also make syrup for cola, various fruit drinks, and Champis.
