= Ljungström sailboat =

Swedish sailboat

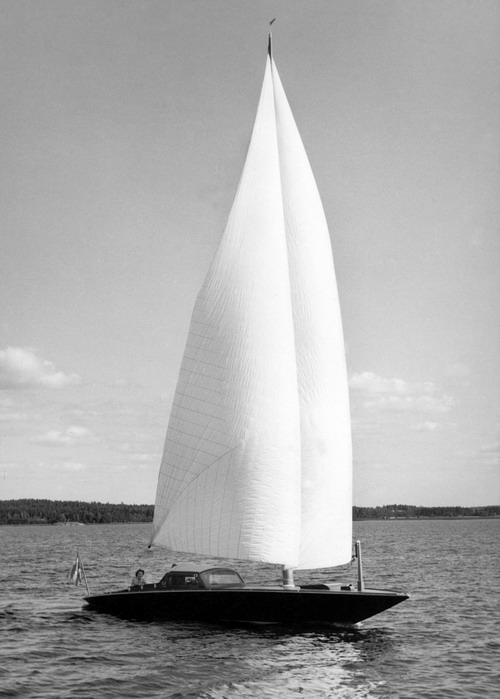
The Ljungström yacht Elly, a TwinWing 480. Foto: 1950.

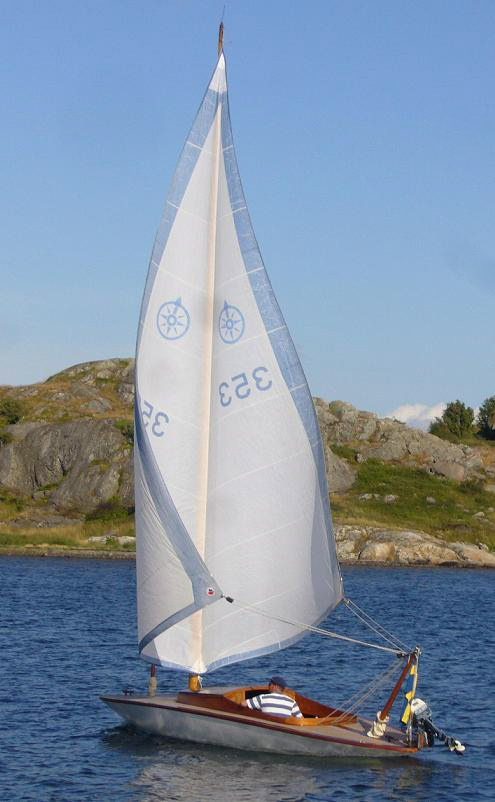
The Ljungström yacht Vingen 10. Foto: 2010.

Ljungström sailboats were created by the Swedish engineer Fredrik Ljungström, who was interested in sailing since childhood. A "Ljungström sailboat" typically has a Circular arc hull and a Ljungström rig. A Ljungström rig mast has no mast stays. The mast rotates on two ball bearings often flying double mainsails, with no foresails. In their time the Ljungström sailboats were a minor revolution as they were fast, safe and easy to sail as well as relatively easy and affordable to produce.

The models were named The Wing and the number (Swedish Vingen 1, Vingen 2 etc.) chronologically. A few models were built in series, such as Vingen 11A and the Twin Wing which was specifically produced for the US market. The design was not appreciated by the fairly conservative yacht clubs at the time, so development was done with scarce means.

Approximately sixty boats (of different sizes) were produced. Approximately eighteen are known to still exist; a dozen of those are sailing, and the rest are undergoing renovation or waiting for renovation.

== The Circular Arc Hull ==
The hull of the Ljungström boats are designed according to the circular arc, with a negative top line to create minimal wind turbulence around the hull, support the unstayed mast and simplify the production. To avoid wet timber ends the boards are applied from the bottom up. This way the longest board goes from stern to stern while the shortest ones are almost parallel to the railing midships.

The shape gave the boats the nickname The Arch Support, but is brilliant in many ways: - When sailing it is noticed that the volume counteracting swaying is midships and that the surface exposed to the wind at the sterns is minimised which makes manoeuvring at low speed easier in narrow and windy places. - The production is simplified as the ribs are all of the same shape and that the planks are made of parallel-surfaced bars.

== Rigging and sails ==
The Ljungström rig was constructed to improve safety on board. It facilitates reefing at such rapid weather changes and eliminates the risk of a hard boom in the head. In addition, walking on deck during sailing is completely unnecessary as everything is handled from the cockpit. This is normal for modern boats with all the trains routed to the cockpit, but was very ahead of its time in the 40s when the cases and similar ropes was fastened on the mast.

The mast, which lacks shroud and bar, is hollow case and consists of glued wood with a hoisted (a planed or machined grooved) luff. The relatively coarse mast is supported by simple ball bearings at deck fitting and in the bottom. The sails are hoisted and hauled usually only once, in spring and autumn. During the season the sail(s) are wound up on the mast by this rotated by a crank in the cockpit which drives an endless rope on a collar attached to the lower part of the mast. Reefing is therefore simple. By rotating the mast slightly a better aerodynamic profile which avoids turbulence on the leeward side of the circular mast is created. At full run the two sails are hauled on each side so the sail area doubled.

Rig design was patented 1938, see United States Patent 4367688 "Sailboat were having twin booms, DOUBLED sail and rotatable mast Permits Conventional sailing with bothering booms and sail sections on Sami thanks or with booms spread, wing and wing, to run before the wind or on a reach. Sail may be reefed or furled by rotating the mast. "

Ljungström also developed a solution to easily adjust the mast tilt (forward / backward) through a roll in the mast foot (April 1921). In this way, the mast relatively easily tilted fore and aft to adjust the boat's ltendency to luff depending on wind strength.

The Ljungström rig was easy to handle but got no more widespread among sailboat manufacturers as sailing at full and broad reach were less efficient than rigs with a jib and boom that provides a better air flow. Contemporary tests of Swedish, Norwegian and Swedish yacht club showed Ljungström rig superior in full run and close reach, where it also gave higher altitude against the wind. The Royal Yacht Squadron in England equipped two boats of the type Redwing with Ljungström rigs to match them against the conventional rigged Redwings. The races that could be completed showed an advantage to Ljungström's rig.

== Wharfs ==
- Company Nyköping Automobile Factory, founded in 1937 (and was merged with Saab Ana 1960) built 13 Ljungström sailboats between 1934 and 1945.
- Several boats, e.g. Vingen 10 and 12, were built in 1949 at Ljungström's summer house in Fiskebäckskil

== Legacy ==
The boats became popular in North America. The Ljungström rig has inspired among others:

- Walt Scott designed Beachcomber. Built in 24 specimens of Marine Innovators of Clearwater, Florida
- The Canadian Gordon Fisher, who along with designer Mark Ellis and George Hinterhoeller built almost a thousand Nonsuch 22 to 36 feet
- Storbåten ("The Big Boat", nowadays called the Saaristo boat) open with centerboard and dual sails on two rotating masts.

A structure that must be mentioned is that of Jac Iverssen designed Tesla. 13.8 m, completely roofed housing headroom and two lounges. Tesla was monouvred from ahead of the mast. Today (2010) Tesla is in need of renovation.

== Other similar designs ==
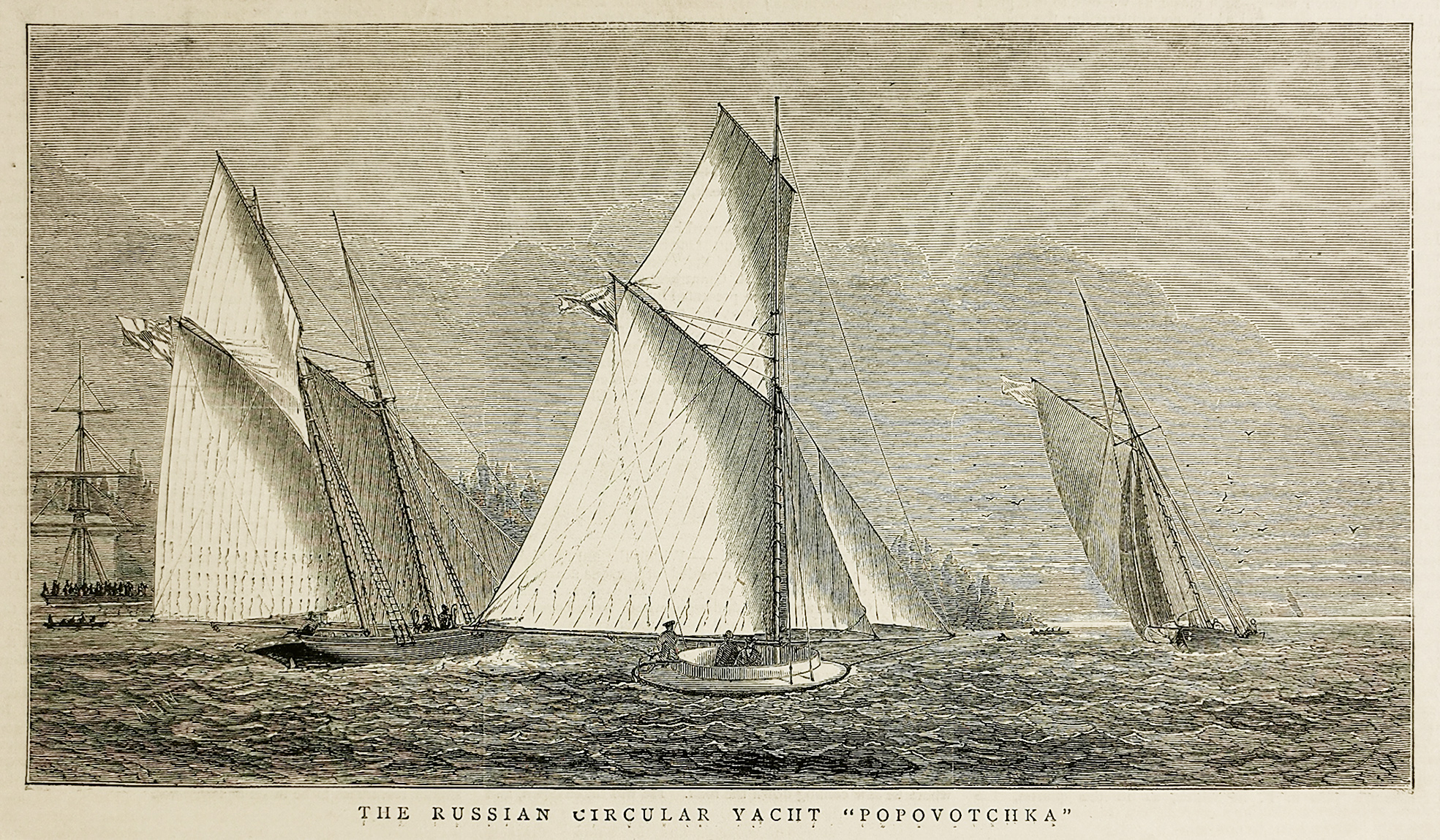
The Russian Circular Yacht 'Popovotchka. illustrated in The Graphic of 1876

The Russian Circular Yacht Popovotchka was displayed in 1876.

== Printed sources ==
- "Ljungström boat 75 years" by Dr. Olle Ljungström, self-published
- "Frederick Ljungström 1875-1964 Inventor and inspirer" by the son Olle Ljungström, Sweden Mekanisters Riksförening 1999, ISBN 91-630-7639-X
- "Swedish wooden boats" by Patrik Linden and Millde Andreas, 2003, Publisher Albert Bonnier AB, ISBN 91-0-05-8135-6, Libris = 9153267
- "Birger and Fredrik Ljungström - inventors" by Sven A. Hansson, 1955, Libris = 218206
