= Julmust =

Swedish soft drink mainly consumed around Christmas or Easter

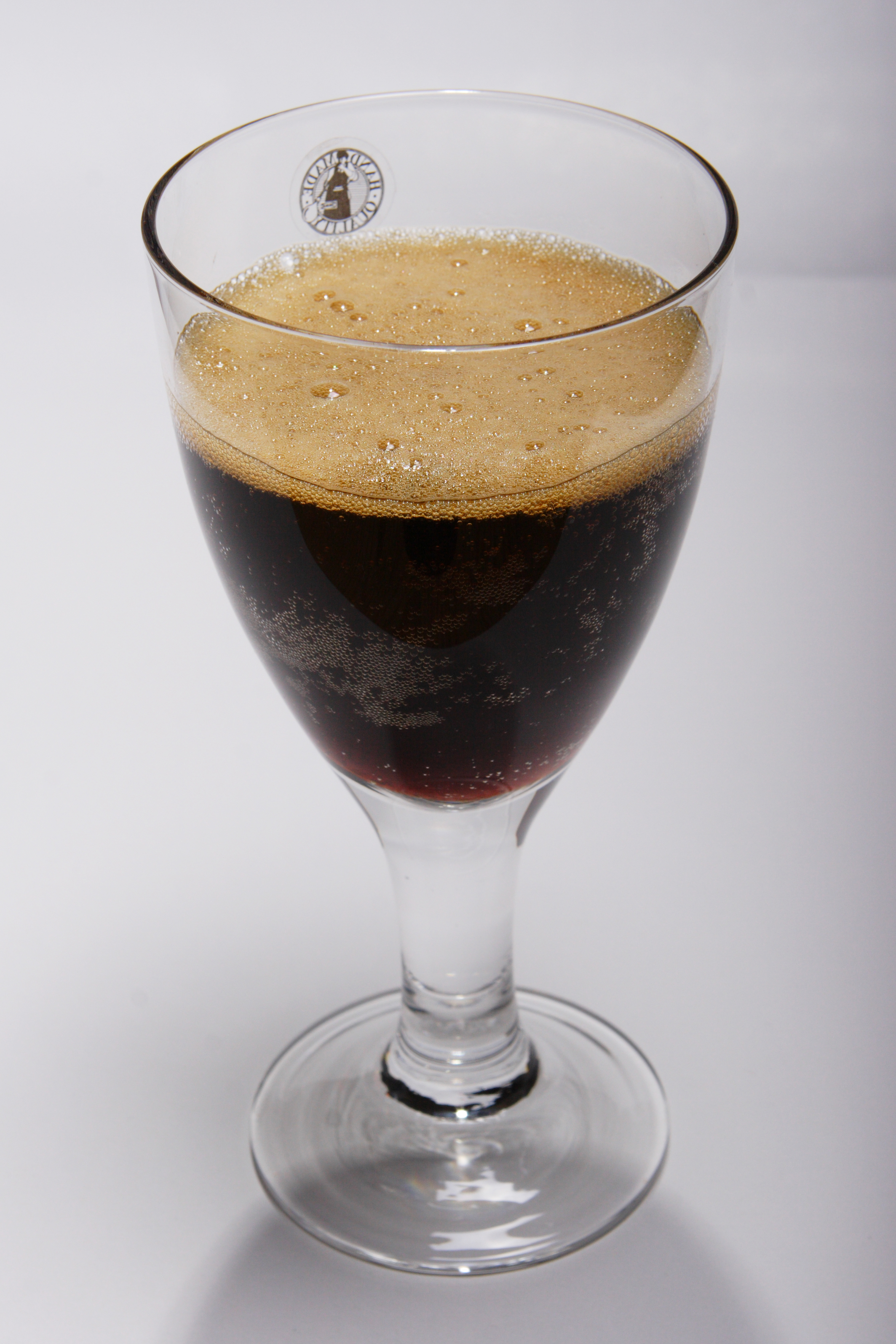
- A glass of Julmust (Center)
- Type: Non-alcoholic mixed drink
- Origin: Sweden, Örebro, Sweden
- Introduced: 1910
- Proof (US): 0
- Colour: Brown

Julmust (Swedish: jul "Christmas" and must English: 'must' "not-yet-fermented fruit juice") is a soft drink that is mainly consumed in Sweden around Christmas. During Easter, the name is påskmust (from påsk, "Easter"). During the rest of the year, it is sometimes sold under the name must. The content is the same regardless of the marketing name, and the drink is most closely associated with Christmas. 45 million litres of julmust are consumed during December, which is around 50% of the total soft drink volume in December and 75% of the total yearly must sales. Must was created by Harry Roberts and his father Robert Roberts in 1910 as a non-alcoholic alternative to beer.

== Ingredients ==
The syrup is still made exclusively by Roberts in Örebro. The syrup is sold to different soft drink manufacturers who then make the final product in their own way. This means that the must from different companies does not taste the same, although they are made of the same syrup.

Must is made of carbonated water, sugar, hop extract, malt extract, spices, caramel colouring, citric acid, and preservatives. The hops and malt extracts give the must a somewhat root beer-like taste without the sassafras – or British/Caribbean malt drinks such as Supermalt. It can be aged provided it is stored in a glass bottle. Some people buy julmust in December only to store it a year before drinking it. In 2013, a rumour occurred that the EU would ban julmust due to a directive banning the selling of malt beverages containing caramel colouring. The rumour however turned out to be false since julmust is not a fermented beverage and hence not affected by the directive.

== Julmust and Coca-Cola ==
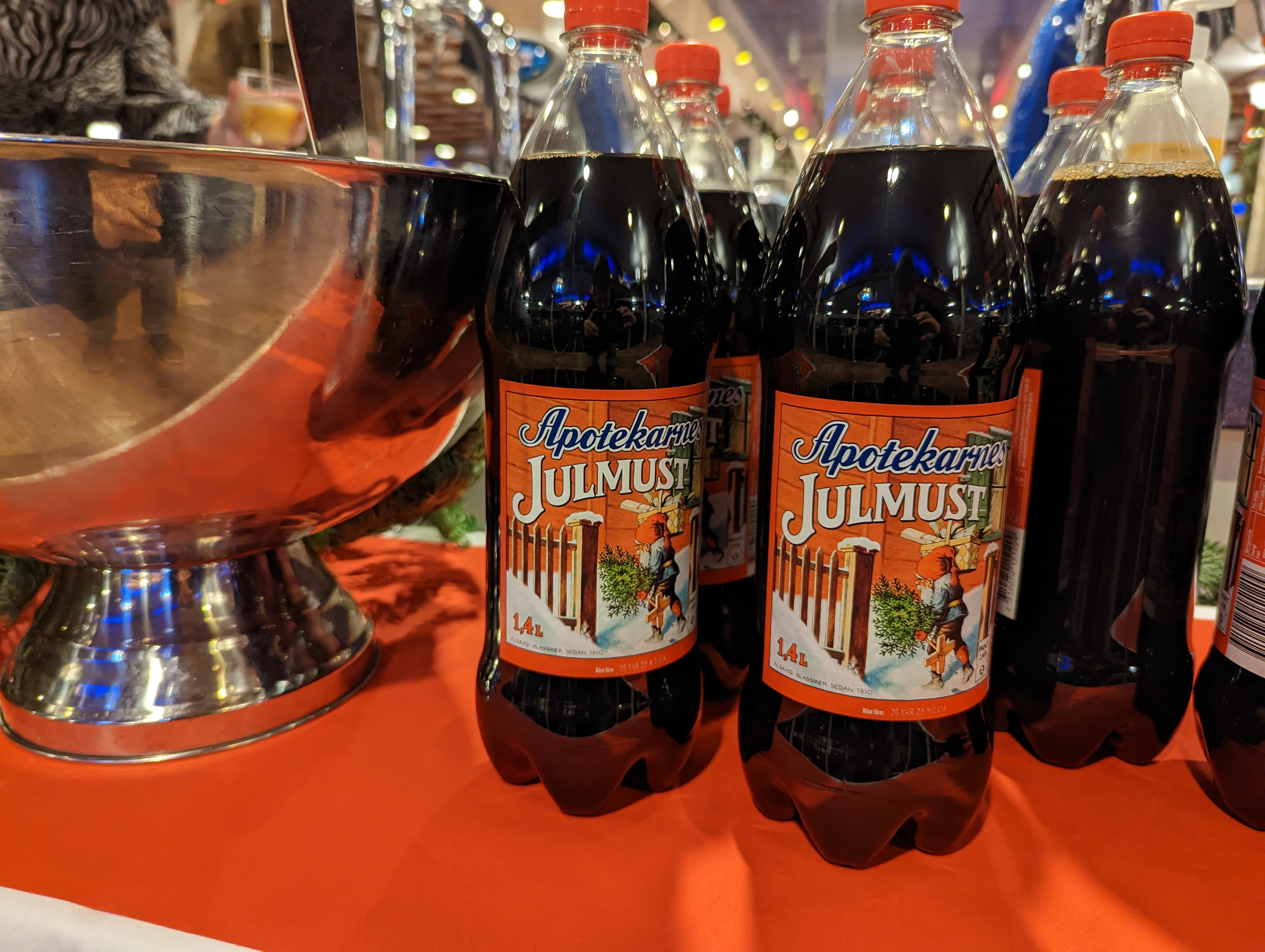
Bottles of julmust offered at a buffet.

In Sweden, julmust outsells Coca-Cola during the Christmas season; in fact, the consumption of Coca-Cola drops by as much as 50% over the holiday. This was quoted as one of the main reasons that The Coca-Cola Company broke away from their contract with the local brewer Pripps and started Coca-Cola Drycker Sverige AB instead. Coca-Cola Drycker Sverige AB produced its own julmust, with The Coca-Cola Company's name occupying only a small space on the label. Their julmust was never advertised until 2004, when Coca-Cola started marketing their julmust under the brand "Bjäre julmust", but they bought the syrup from Roberts AB. By 2007, the "Bjäre julmust" was only sold at McDonald's restaurants and it had completely disappeared from Coca-Colas range of products by Christmas 2008, only to return for Christmas 2011.

== See also ==
- Malt drink
- Kvass
- Dandelion and burdock
- List of soft drinks by country
- Svagdricka
