= Jonas Offrell =

Swedish priest and firearms inventor

- Born: 1803
- Died: 1863 (aged 59–60)
- Occupation: Priest

Jonas Offrell (1803 – 1863) was a Swedish priest who developed a revolver at the same time and independently of Samuel Colt.

Offrell was born in 1803 into a farming family. In 1826 he came to Uppsala University to study theology. In 1838, Offrell designed a rapid-fire revolver. Offrell first test fired the revolver in the summer of 1839. In 1841, Offrell received a patent for his innovation.
