= Oscar Kjellberg =

Swedish inventor and industrialist (1870–1931)

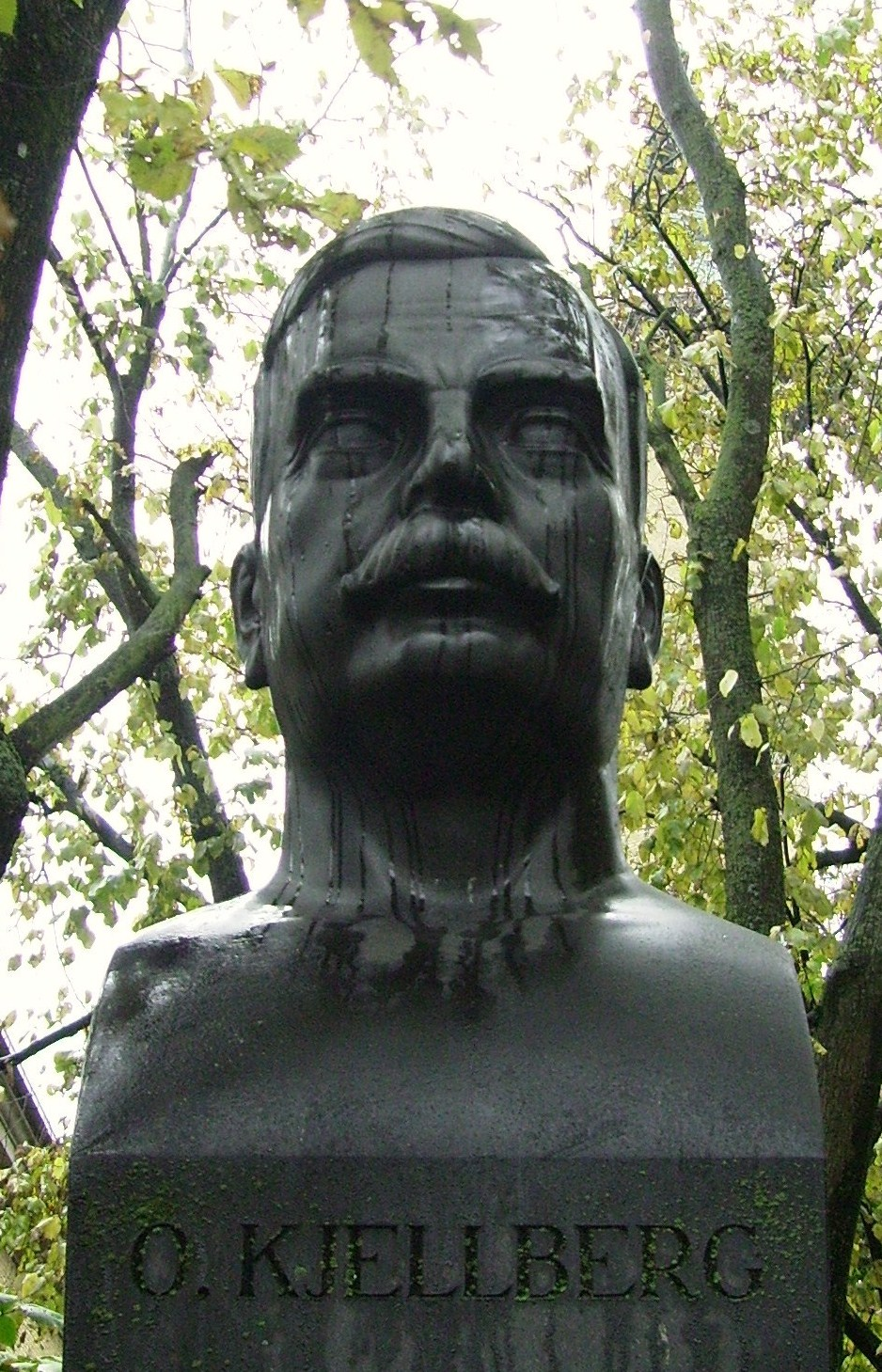
- Bust of Kjellberg by Arvid Bryth, 1957
- Born: 21 September 1870
- Died: 5 July 1931 (aged 60)
- Occupations: Inventor; industrialist
- Known for: ESAB; Kjellberg Finsterwalde

Oscar Kjellberg (21 September 1870 – 5 July 1931) was a Swedish inventor and industrialist. These included new developments in weldings and coatings, including the covered electrode.

He invented the coated electrode used in manual metal arc welding (Swedish Patent: 27152, June 29, 1907), by dipping a bare iron wire in a thick mixture of carbonates and silicates and refined this process between 1907 and 1914. The purpose of the coating is to generate a fume cloud that protects the molten metal from reacting with the oxygen and nitrogen (as is present in the ambient atmosphere) during the brief period of time that the metal requires to cool and solidify. His pioneering work in covered electrode development paved the road during the next twenty years in the research of reliable flux-coated welding electrodes.

== Life ==
Kjellberg was born in Motterud, Sweden in 1870. He was the eldest of five children of Johannes and Karolina Kjellberg. After early schooling, he became at apprentice at the Kristinehamns Mekaniska Verkstad school. In 1888, he became an engine-room apprentice with the Broström shipping group under Axel Ludvig Broström. He later qualified as a ship's engineering officer. He passed his Chief engineers exam in 1898. From 1903, he established a workshop for inventions, developing a new technique for electrical welding. He founded Elektriska Svetsnings-Aktiebolaget (ESAB) in 1904. His first patent was dated 14 July 1905. He founded Kjellberg Finsterwalde in 1922.
