= Ljungström rig =

Double triangular mainsails furling on an unstayed rotating mast

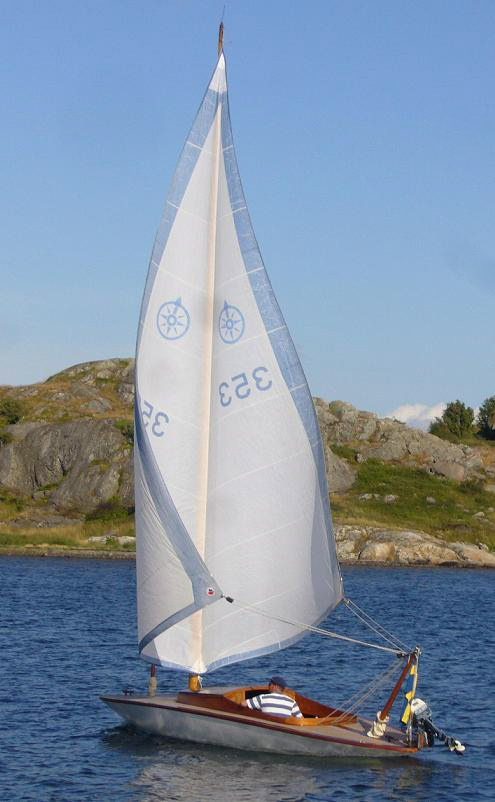
The Ljungström yacht Vingen 10. Foto: 2010.

Ljungström rig is the name for the sailing rig designed by Swedish engineer Fredrik Ljungström with double main sails and rotating mast, but without boom, foresail, forestay and shroud. The early models of the Ljungström sailboat had a stern stay but this was omitted around 1945, before the model 12 (Vingen 12).

The Ljungström rig is competitive towards the competing rigs from that time when close hauled and full run but is lacking at beam reach and broad reach. Its main purpose and advantage is, however, safety and ease of handling.

== History ==
The first Ljungström rig was developed by the Swedish engineer Fredrik Ljungström to enhance safety at sea. The family had been close to severe accidents with the traditionally rigged Ebella, nowadays named Beatrice Aurore, when in hard weather the crew had to walk on deck to take in sail. Ljungström, in order to not risk the safety of his crew, designed a boomless rig handled completely from the cockpit.

== Components ==
=== Mast ===
The mast is made of glued clean wood, conical, without stays or shrouds. Boom, pole, gaff, spreaders and such are completely omitted. The mast is supported by two ball bearings, one at the keel and one at the deck hole, and can thus rotate freely. The rotation is created using a wooden collar, with a V-shaped track, around the mast below deck. Around this collar an infinite rope sling runs through two blocks to a winch, powered by hand or an electric motor. In this way the sail is rolled onto the mast when less area is needed or when the sailing is finished. As a result of the conic mast, the clew will move up the less sail that exposed. As a result of the mast taper the clew will end up higher and higher the closer it is to the mast.

The mast is hollow, partly to reduce weight (up to 4.5% of a keelboat's displacement), and partly so that the halyard can run inside the mast, and therefore manufactured in two halves. At the top is a metal bracket with pulley for the halyard which then runs inside the mast and comes out below deck, where a pulley is located under the mast root. The mast foot is tapered so the mast stands firmly in the lower tapered ball bearing.

Level with the deck is the mast "bottleneck" where the upper ball bearing rests. By means of a bracket bolted to the deck upper surface the upper ball bearing is kept in place, thereby keeping the mast from being lifted from the lower layer.

=== Sail ===
A Ljungström rig usually has two sails, stitched together at the luff. On all points of sail, except a full run, these sails are close together. In the unlikely event that one of the sails would rip the other still stands and the boat can safely reach harbor.

The Ljungström rig is often compared with a staysail with the big difference that the mast bends inversely to the forestay. This must be compensated for so that the luff is provided a belly which is <30% of the masthead deflection, about 2% of the luff length. Since the sail is hoisted throughout the season, it is appropriate that leach and foot consists of UV-resistant fabric that covers the entire mast in its furled state.

=== Sheeting ===
The two sails each have their own independent sheet. On previous models the blocks sat on the deck aft area but later improved forwarding with a pole which raised the sheeting point about one meter. Some models have a winch.

The advantage of the Ljungström rig, besides the simplicity and safety, is in the engineer's knowledge of fluid dynamics. The mast is rotated so that the sail rests on the mast at lee. This is to minimize turbulent flow on the leeward side of the mast and the propulsion force, which is so important, becomes almost undisturbed. This was totally new for that time and made a boat with Ljungström rig point higher than its contemporary competitors. Today profiled masts addresses this problem, but hardly more efficiently. The real showpiece, however, is at full run where the two sails separate as butterfly wings, sheeted on each side, similar to a spinnaker, but with no extra booms or guys needed.

=== Sources ===
- "Fredrik Ljungström 1875–1964 – Inventor and inspirer", by the son Olle Ljungström, Svenska Mekanisters Riksförening 1999, ISBN 91-630-7639-X
- "Ljungström boat 75 years" by Olle Ljungström 2008 (self-published)
- "Roller Mast Takes the Sweat Out Of Sailing". Popular Science: 58–59. July 1951.
