= Sven Åderman =

Swedish inventor and officer

- Occupations: Inventor, officer

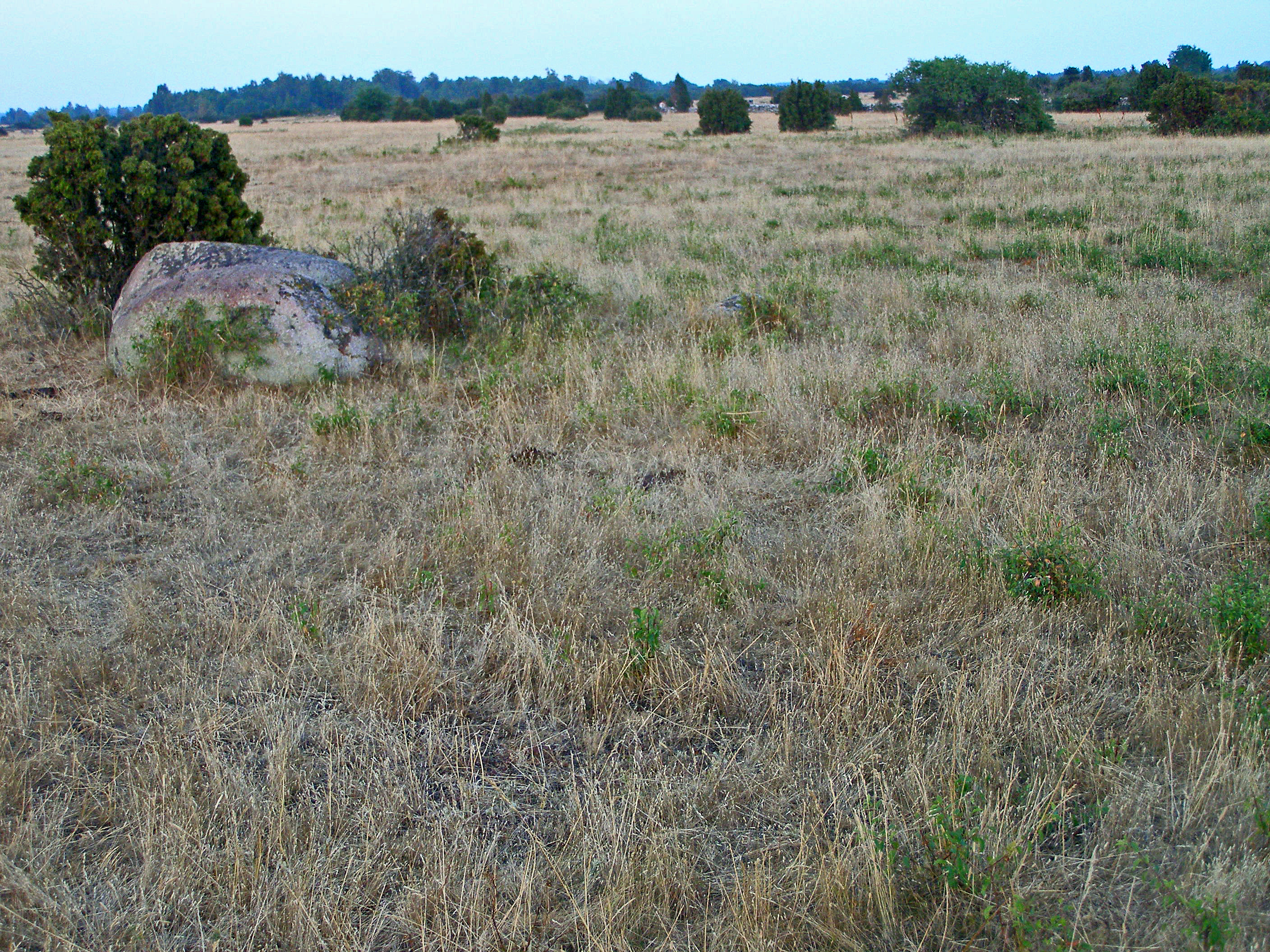
View across alvar plain of historic Halltorps estate

Sven Åderman was a Swedish inventor and officer who created a musket capable of firing more rapidly than other conventional weaponry of the late 17th century. This musket was first used in the Great Northern War. For his efforts King Frederick I of Sweden bestowed upon him the estate of Halltorp in the year 1723. At this time Åderman was a major. Halltorp had been a royal hunting farm belonging to the Swedish Crown for centuries.

== See also ==
- Öland
- Smoothbore
