= ESAB =

American-Swedish industrial company pvt ltd

ESAB Corporation
- Type: Public company
- Traded as: NYSE: ESAB; S&P 400 component
- Industry: Manufacturing, welding, fabrication
- Founded: 1904; 122 years ago in Gothenburg, Sweden
- Founder: Oscar Kjellberg
- Headquarters: North Bethesda, Maryland, U.S.
- Area served: Worldwide
- Key people: Shyam Kambeyanda, CEO; Mitchell Rales, Chairman of the Board
- Number of employees: 9,000 (2022)
- Parent: ESAB Corporation
- Website: esab.com

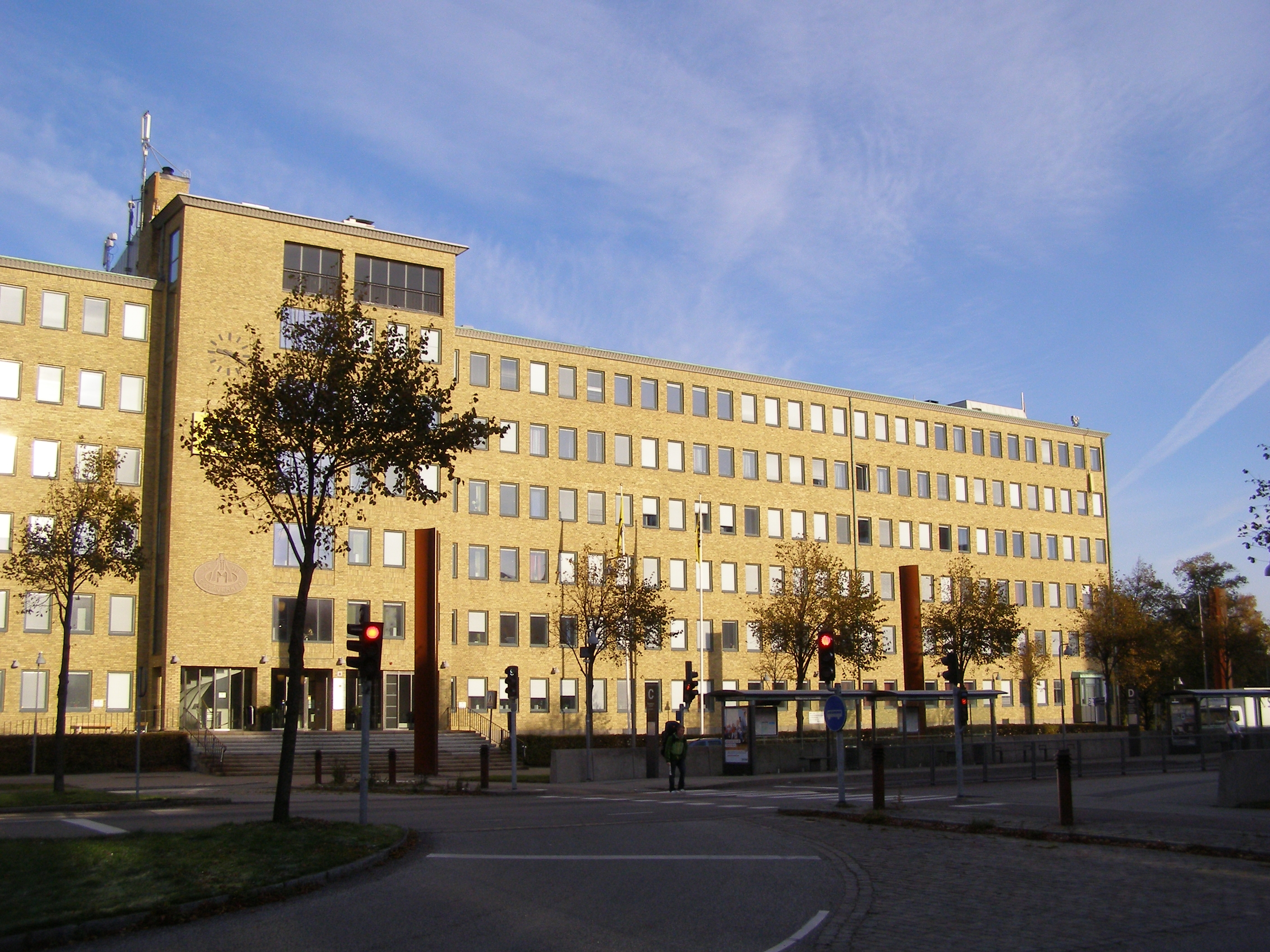
ESAB headquarters in Gothenburg.

ESAB, Elektriska Svetsnings-Aktiebolaget (English: Electric Welding Limited company), is an American-Swedish industrial company.

The ultimate parent company of ESAB is ESAB Corporation, a New York Stock Exchange listed (Ticker: ESAB) with its principal executive office in North Bethesda, Maryland, U.S.

ESAB products includes a fabrication technology arm, which includes welding, cutting, gas control, PPE, software, and robotic equipment and a separate gas control portfolio focused on healthcare, industrial, and specialty gas control solutions.

== History ==
The company was founded in 1904 by Swedish businessman Oscar Kjellberg in Gothenburg, Sweden. The company sells equipment for welding and cutting.

Other notable CEO was Lars Westerberg who ran ESAB for three years.

The ESAB was acquired by Charter International in 1994.

The ESAB group was acquired by Colfax Corporation on 13 January 2012.

Following the purchase, the CEO of Colfax, Clay Kiefaber, stepped down to the president role of ESAB and was replaced by Steve Simms.

The ESAB group acquired the Welding Wire business of Sandvik effective February 1, 2018. The acquisition included production units in Scranton, PA, and Sandviken, Sweden; the technical sales and product management organization; as well as multiyear strategic collaboration on R&D for future product developments.

On April 5, 2022, Colfax Corp. (now Enovis Corp.) distributed 100% of the shares of ESAB Corporation to Colfax shareholders. The spin-off transaction was registered with the U.S. Securities and Exchange Commission through a Form 10-12B registration statement. An Information Statement was sent to Colfax shareholders.

On October 17, 2022, ESAB Corporation announced the acquisition of Ohio Medical, a global leader in oxygen regulators and central gas systems for the healthcare industry.

== Critics ==
In January 2024 ESAB was added to Ukraine's list of International Sponsors of War for continuing to operate and expand business in Russia.
